

350001–350100 

|-bgcolor=#E9E9E9
| 350001 ||  || — || February 16, 2001 || Kitt Peak || Spacewatch || HEN || align=right data-sort-value="0.81" | 810 m || 
|-id=002 bgcolor=#E9E9E9
| 350002 ||  || — || June 22, 2007 || Kitt Peak || Spacewatch || — || align=right | 1.2 km || 
|-id=003 bgcolor=#d6d6d6
| 350003 ||  || — || March 25, 2010 || Kitt Peak || Spacewatch || KOR || align=right | 1.5 km || 
|-id=004 bgcolor=#E9E9E9
| 350004 ||  || — || April 10, 2010 || Kitt Peak || Spacewatch || — || align=right | 3.2 km || 
|-id=005 bgcolor=#fefefe
| 350005 ||  || — || April 4, 2010 || Kitt Peak || Spacewatch || ERI || align=right | 1.7 km || 
|-id=006 bgcolor=#C2FFFF
| 350006 ||  || — || April 15, 2010 || WISE || WISE || L5 || align=right | 11 km || 
|-id=007 bgcolor=#E9E9E9
| 350007 ||  || — || April 14, 2010 || Mount Lemmon || Mount Lemmon Survey || fast? || align=right | 2.2 km || 
|-id=008 bgcolor=#E9E9E9
| 350008 ||  || — || April 12, 2010 || Kitt Peak || Spacewatch || — || align=right | 2.1 km || 
|-id=009 bgcolor=#C2FFFF
| 350009 ||  || — || April 26, 2010 || WISE || WISE || L5 || align=right | 13 km || 
|-id=010 bgcolor=#d6d6d6
| 350010 ||  || — || April 27, 2010 || WISE || WISE || — || align=right | 2.1 km || 
|-id=011 bgcolor=#d6d6d6
| 350011 ||  || — || April 28, 2010 || WISE || WISE || EUP || align=right | 6.1 km || 
|-id=012 bgcolor=#E9E9E9
| 350012 ||  || — || April 20, 2010 || Kitt Peak || Spacewatch || — || align=right | 2.1 km || 
|-id=013 bgcolor=#E9E9E9
| 350013 ||  || — || April 23, 2010 || Purple Mountain || PMO NEO || — || align=right | 3.1 km || 
|-id=014 bgcolor=#E9E9E9
| 350014 ||  || — || May 5, 2010 || Catalina || CSS || JUN || align=right | 3.9 km || 
|-id=015 bgcolor=#E9E9E9
| 350015 ||  || — || October 4, 2007 || Kitt Peak || Spacewatch || — || align=right | 1.9 km || 
|-id=016 bgcolor=#E9E9E9
| 350016 ||  || — || May 3, 2010 || Kitt Peak || Spacewatch || — || align=right | 1.0 km || 
|-id=017 bgcolor=#E9E9E9
| 350017 ||  || — || May 6, 2010 || Mount Lemmon || Mount Lemmon Survey || EUN || align=right | 1.6 km || 
|-id=018 bgcolor=#E9E9E9
| 350018 ||  || — || May 3, 2010 || Kitt Peak || Spacewatch || — || align=right | 2.9 km || 
|-id=019 bgcolor=#d6d6d6
| 350019 ||  || — || November 11, 2007 || Mount Lemmon || Mount Lemmon Survey || — || align=right | 3.6 km || 
|-id=020 bgcolor=#fefefe
| 350020 ||  || — || May 11, 2010 || Mount Lemmon || Mount Lemmon Survey || — || align=right | 1.2 km || 
|-id=021 bgcolor=#E9E9E9
| 350021 ||  || — || January 19, 2005 || Catalina || CSS || — || align=right | 1.5 km || 
|-id=022 bgcolor=#d6d6d6
| 350022 ||  || — || May 3, 2010 || Kitt Peak || Spacewatch || HYG || align=right | 3.7 km || 
|-id=023 bgcolor=#E9E9E9
| 350023 ||  || — || January 3, 2001 || Socorro || LINEAR || — || align=right | 1.7 km || 
|-id=024 bgcolor=#d6d6d6
| 350024 ||  || — || May 13, 2010 || Kitt Peak || Spacewatch || — || align=right | 4.5 km || 
|-id=025 bgcolor=#E9E9E9
| 350025 ||  || — || January 22, 2010 || WISE || WISE || DOR || align=right | 3.6 km || 
|-id=026 bgcolor=#E9E9E9
| 350026 ||  || — || May 9, 2010 || Siding Spring || SSS || — || align=right | 2.4 km || 
|-id=027 bgcolor=#d6d6d6
| 350027 ||  || — || May 12, 2010 || Mount Lemmon || Mount Lemmon Survey || — || align=right | 3.7 km || 
|-id=028 bgcolor=#d6d6d6
| 350028 ||  || — || June 20, 2007 || Kitt Peak || Spacewatch || EOS || align=right | 3.1 km || 
|-id=029 bgcolor=#E9E9E9
| 350029 ||  || — || May 21, 1993 || Kitt Peak || Spacewatch || — || align=right | 2.0 km || 
|-id=030 bgcolor=#E9E9E9
| 350030 ||  || — || May 11, 2010 || Mount Lemmon || Mount Lemmon Survey || — || align=right | 2.6 km || 
|-id=031 bgcolor=#d6d6d6
| 350031 ||  || — || May 11, 2010 || Mount Lemmon || Mount Lemmon Survey || VER || align=right | 4.0 km || 
|-id=032 bgcolor=#E9E9E9
| 350032 Josephhunt ||  ||  || February 17, 2010 || WISE || WISE || — || align=right | 3.3 km || 
|-id=033 bgcolor=#E9E9E9
| 350033 ||  || — || May 11, 2010 || Kitt Peak || Spacewatch || — || align=right | 2.4 km || 
|-id=034 bgcolor=#E9E9E9
| 350034 ||  || — || May 9, 2010 || Mount Lemmon || Mount Lemmon Survey || — || align=right | 2.9 km || 
|-id=035 bgcolor=#E9E9E9
| 350035 ||  || — || May 5, 2010 || Mount Lemmon || Mount Lemmon Survey || — || align=right | 1.6 km || 
|-id=036 bgcolor=#d6d6d6
| 350036 ||  || — || April 10, 2005 || Mount Lemmon || Mount Lemmon Survey || — || align=right | 1.9 km || 
|-id=037 bgcolor=#E9E9E9
| 350037 ||  || — || December 6, 2000 || Socorro || LINEAR || — || align=right | 1.8 km || 
|-id=038 bgcolor=#E9E9E9
| 350038 ||  || — || May 17, 2010 || WISE || WISE || PAE || align=right | 4.2 km || 
|-id=039 bgcolor=#d6d6d6
| 350039 ||  || — || October 15, 2001 || Palomar || NEAT || — || align=right | 3.6 km || 
|-id=040 bgcolor=#fefefe
| 350040 ||  || — || May 20, 2010 || Mount Lemmon || Mount Lemmon Survey || MAS || align=right data-sort-value="0.88" | 880 m || 
|-id=041 bgcolor=#E9E9E9
| 350041 ||  || — || May 19, 2010 || Catalina || CSS || — || align=right | 2.3 km || 
|-id=042 bgcolor=#E9E9E9
| 350042 ||  || — || April 23, 1998 || Kitt Peak || Spacewatch || — || align=right | 3.0 km || 
|-id=043 bgcolor=#fefefe
| 350043 ||  || — || November 30, 2005 || Mount Lemmon || Mount Lemmon Survey || V || align=right data-sort-value="0.71" | 710 m || 
|-id=044 bgcolor=#d6d6d6
| 350044 ||  || — || June 20, 2004 || Kitt Peak || Spacewatch || — || align=right | 5.6 km || 
|-id=045 bgcolor=#E9E9E9
| 350045 ||  || — || June 1, 2010 || Catalina || CSS || EUN || align=right | 1.5 km || 
|-id=046 bgcolor=#d6d6d6
| 350046 ||  || — || July 11, 2010 || La Sagra || OAM Obs. || Tj (2.96) || align=right | 4.7 km || 
|-id=047 bgcolor=#E9E9E9
| 350047 ||  || — || July 16, 2010 || WISE || WISE || BRU || align=right | 5.1 km || 
|-id=048 bgcolor=#E9E9E9
| 350048 ||  || — || January 11, 2008 || Kitt Peak || Spacewatch || — || align=right | 1.4 km || 
|-id=049 bgcolor=#d6d6d6
| 350049 ||  || — || June 13, 2005 || Campo Imperatore || CINEOS || — || align=right | 3.3 km || 
|-id=050 bgcolor=#E9E9E9
| 350050 ||  || — || August 1, 2010 || WISE || WISE || PAD || align=right | 2.9 km || 
|-id=051 bgcolor=#C2FFFF
| 350051 ||  || — || August 5, 2010 || WISE || WISE || L4ERY || align=right | 11 km || 
|-id=052 bgcolor=#C2FFFF
| 350052 ||  || — || March 26, 2003 || Kitt Peak || Spacewatch || L4 || align=right | 13 km || 
|-id=053 bgcolor=#C2FFFF
| 350053 ||  || — || August 7, 2010 || WISE || WISE || L4ERY || align=right | 8.2 km || 
|-id=054 bgcolor=#d6d6d6
| 350054 ||  || — || September 13, 2002 || Palomar || NEAT || SHU3:2 || align=right | 7.0 km || 
|-id=055 bgcolor=#C2FFFF
| 350055 ||  || — || November 26, 2009 || Mount Lemmon || Mount Lemmon Survey || L4 || align=right | 13 km || 
|-id=056 bgcolor=#d6d6d6
| 350056 ||  || — || September 29, 2005 || Catalina || CSS || — || align=right | 4.8 km || 
|-id=057 bgcolor=#fefefe
| 350057 ||  || — || February 22, 2009 || Mount Lemmon || Mount Lemmon Survey || H || align=right data-sort-value="0.71" | 710 m || 
|-id=058 bgcolor=#d6d6d6
| 350058 ||  || — || September 27, 2005 || Kitt Peak || Spacewatch || — || align=right | 3.7 km || 
|-id=059 bgcolor=#C2FFFF
| 350059 ||  || — || August 15, 2009 || Kitt Peak || Spacewatch || L4 || align=right | 8.9 km || 
|-id=060 bgcolor=#C2FFFF
| 350060 ||  || — || November 4, 2010 || Les Engarouines || L. Bernasconi || L4 || align=right | 11 km || 
|-id=061 bgcolor=#C2FFFF
| 350061 ||  || — || November 6, 2010 || Mount Lemmon || Mount Lemmon Survey || L4 || align=right | 11 km || 
|-id=062 bgcolor=#d6d6d6
| 350062 ||  || — || September 30, 2009 || Mount Lemmon || Mount Lemmon Survey || — || align=right | 3.7 km || 
|-id=063 bgcolor=#fefefe
| 350063 ||  || — || February 8, 2011 || Mount Lemmon || Mount Lemmon Survey || H || align=right data-sort-value="0.98" | 980 m || 
|-id=064 bgcolor=#fefefe
| 350064 ||  || — || July 4, 2005 || Mount Lemmon || Mount Lemmon Survey || — || align=right data-sort-value="0.89" | 890 m || 
|-id=065 bgcolor=#fefefe
| 350065 ||  || — || September 18, 1996 || Prescott || P. G. Comba || — || align=right data-sort-value="0.84" | 840 m || 
|-id=066 bgcolor=#fefefe
| 350066 ||  || — || August 27, 2005 || Palomar || NEAT || FLO || align=right data-sort-value="0.55" | 550 m || 
|-id=067 bgcolor=#fefefe
| 350067 ||  || — || May 1, 2006 || Kitt Peak || Spacewatch || H || align=right data-sort-value="0.64" | 640 m || 
|-id=068 bgcolor=#fefefe
| 350068 ||  || — || August 23, 2008 || Siding Spring || SSS || — || align=right | 1.5 km || 
|-id=069 bgcolor=#fefefe
| 350069 ||  || — || October 15, 2004 || Mount Lemmon || Mount Lemmon Survey || H || align=right data-sort-value="0.70" | 700 m || 
|-id=070 bgcolor=#fefefe
| 350070 ||  || — || July 9, 2008 || Črni Vrh || J. Skvarč || — || align=right data-sort-value="0.85" | 850 m || 
|-id=071 bgcolor=#fefefe
| 350071 ||  || — || October 18, 1995 || Kitt Peak || Spacewatch || FLO || align=right data-sort-value="0.69" | 690 m || 
|-id=072 bgcolor=#fefefe
| 350072 ||  || — || November 30, 2005 || Kitt Peak || Spacewatch || — || align=right | 1.1 km || 
|-id=073 bgcolor=#E9E9E9
| 350073 ||  || — || May 12, 2007 || Mount Lemmon || Mount Lemmon Survey || — || align=right data-sort-value="0.87" | 870 m || 
|-id=074 bgcolor=#E9E9E9
| 350074 ||  || — || May 11, 2007 || Kitt Peak || Spacewatch || — || align=right | 1.3 km || 
|-id=075 bgcolor=#fefefe
| 350075 ||  || — || November 14, 2001 || Kitt Peak || Spacewatch || NYS || align=right data-sort-value="0.81" | 810 m || 
|-id=076 bgcolor=#fefefe
| 350076 ||  || — || December 14, 2001 || Socorro || LINEAR || H || align=right data-sort-value="0.76" | 760 m || 
|-id=077 bgcolor=#fefefe
| 350077 ||  || — || March 2, 2008 || Catalina || CSS || H || align=right data-sort-value="0.95" | 950 m || 
|-id=078 bgcolor=#C2FFFF
| 350078 ||  || — || April 2, 2009 || Mount Lemmon || Mount Lemmon Survey || L5 || align=right | 12 km || 
|-id=079 bgcolor=#fefefe
| 350079 ||  || — || September 15, 2007 || Mount Lemmon || Mount Lemmon Survey || H || align=right data-sort-value="0.97" | 970 m || 
|-id=080 bgcolor=#fefefe
| 350080 ||  || — || June 22, 2004 || Kitt Peak || Spacewatch || MAS || align=right data-sort-value="0.77" | 770 m || 
|-id=081 bgcolor=#fefefe
| 350081 ||  || — || November 17, 2001 || Socorro || LINEAR || H || align=right data-sort-value="0.80" | 800 m || 
|-id=082 bgcolor=#d6d6d6
| 350082 ||  || — || June 19, 2006 || Mount Lemmon || Mount Lemmon Survey || TIR || align=right | 3.5 km || 
|-id=083 bgcolor=#fefefe
| 350083 ||  || — || September 6, 2004 || Palomar || NEAT || V || align=right data-sort-value="0.85" | 850 m || 
|-id=084 bgcolor=#fefefe
| 350084 ||  || — || May 21, 1990 || Kitt Peak || Spacewatch || PHO || align=right data-sort-value="0.82" | 820 m || 
|-id=085 bgcolor=#E9E9E9
| 350085 ||  || — || September 29, 2008 || Mount Lemmon || Mount Lemmon Survey || — || align=right | 1.0 km || 
|-id=086 bgcolor=#fefefe
| 350086 ||  || — || October 31, 2005 || Mount Lemmon || Mount Lemmon Survey || — || align=right data-sort-value="0.90" | 900 m || 
|-id=087 bgcolor=#fefefe
| 350087 ||  || — || March 15, 2004 || Kitt Peak || Spacewatch || FLO || align=right data-sort-value="0.65" | 650 m || 
|-id=088 bgcolor=#E9E9E9
| 350088 ||  || — || July 10, 2007 || Siding Spring || SSS || JUN || align=right | 1.2 km || 
|-id=089 bgcolor=#fefefe
| 350089 ||  || — || August 13, 2008 || Siding Spring || SSS || — || align=right | 2.3 km || 
|-id=090 bgcolor=#E9E9E9
| 350090 ||  || — || February 25, 2006 || Mount Lemmon || Mount Lemmon Survey || — || align=right | 1.8 km || 
|-id=091 bgcolor=#fefefe
| 350091 ||  || — || July 7, 1997 || Caussols || ODAS || — || align=right data-sort-value="0.96" | 960 m || 
|-id=092 bgcolor=#E9E9E9
| 350092 ||  || — || December 20, 2004 || Mount Lemmon || Mount Lemmon Survey || WIT || align=right | 1.2 km || 
|-id=093 bgcolor=#E9E9E9
| 350093 ||  || — || October 3, 2003 || Kitt Peak || Spacewatch || — || align=right | 1.9 km || 
|-id=094 bgcolor=#E9E9E9
| 350094 ||  || — || September 14, 2007 || Kitt Peak || Spacewatch || — || align=right | 1.4 km || 
|-id=095 bgcolor=#fefefe
| 350095 ||  || — || August 16, 2001 || Socorro || LINEAR || — || align=right data-sort-value="0.98" | 980 m || 
|-id=096 bgcolor=#d6d6d6
| 350096 ||  || — || March 5, 1998 || Caussols || ODAS || — || align=right | 4.2 km || 
|-id=097 bgcolor=#d6d6d6
| 350097 ||  || — || February 26, 2003 || Campo Imperatore || CINEOS || — || align=right | 5.8 km || 
|-id=098 bgcolor=#fefefe
| 350098 ||  || — || October 30, 2008 || Mount Lemmon || Mount Lemmon Survey || — || align=right | 1.1 km || 
|-id=099 bgcolor=#E9E9E9
| 350099 ||  || — || August 23, 2003 || Palomar || NEAT || — || align=right | 3.3 km || 
|-id=100 bgcolor=#d6d6d6
| 350100 ||  || — || December 31, 2007 || Kitt Peak || Spacewatch || EUP || align=right | 3.6 km || 
|}

350101–350200 

|-bgcolor=#fefefe
| 350101 ||  || — || December 6, 1996 || Kitt Peak || Spacewatch || — || align=right | 1.4 km || 
|-id=102 bgcolor=#fefefe
| 350102 ||  || — || October 8, 2008 || Mount Lemmon || Mount Lemmon Survey || FLO || align=right data-sort-value="0.80" | 800 m || 
|-id=103 bgcolor=#E9E9E9
| 350103 ||  || — || February 18, 2010 || Kitt Peak || Spacewatch || — || align=right | 1.1 km || 
|-id=104 bgcolor=#E9E9E9
| 350104 ||  || — || September 10, 2007 || Kitt Peak || Spacewatch || — || align=right | 1.3 km || 
|-id=105 bgcolor=#d6d6d6
| 350105 ||  || — || February 21, 2009 || Kitt Peak || Spacewatch || — || align=right | 2.4 km || 
|-id=106 bgcolor=#d6d6d6
| 350106 ||  || — || September 15, 2006 || Kitt Peak || Spacewatch || — || align=right | 3.0 km || 
|-id=107 bgcolor=#d6d6d6
| 350107 ||  || — || September 17, 2006 || Catalina || CSS || TIR || align=right | 3.8 km || 
|-id=108 bgcolor=#E9E9E9
| 350108 ||  || — || September 30, 2003 || Anderson Mesa || LONEOS || HNS || align=right | 1.9 km || 
|-id=109 bgcolor=#C2FFFF
| 350109 ||  || — || December 19, 2003 || Kitt Peak || Spacewatch || L5 || align=right | 14 km || 
|-id=110 bgcolor=#d6d6d6
| 350110 ||  || — || September 29, 2001 || Palomar || NEAT || EOS || align=right | 2.4 km || 
|-id=111 bgcolor=#E9E9E9
| 350111 ||  || — || August 5, 2002 || Palomar || NEAT || — || align=right | 2.2 km || 
|-id=112 bgcolor=#d6d6d6
| 350112 ||  || — || February 14, 2010 || WISE || WISE || EUP || align=right | 4.4 km || 
|-id=113 bgcolor=#E9E9E9
| 350113 ||  || — || January 21, 2009 || Bergisch Gladbach || W. Bickel || INO || align=right | 1.6 km || 
|-id=114 bgcolor=#d6d6d6
| 350114 ||  || — || September 19, 2006 || Kitt Peak || Spacewatch || HYG || align=right | 2.5 km || 
|-id=115 bgcolor=#d6d6d6
| 350115 ||  || — || March 29, 2004 || Kitt Peak || Spacewatch || — || align=right | 2.9 km || 
|-id=116 bgcolor=#fefefe
| 350116 ||  || — || March 27, 2003 || Palomar || NEAT || — || align=right data-sort-value="0.99" | 990 m || 
|-id=117 bgcolor=#fefefe
| 350117 ||  || — || October 25, 2005 || Kitt Peak || Spacewatch || — || align=right data-sort-value="0.79" | 790 m || 
|-id=118 bgcolor=#d6d6d6
| 350118 ||  || — || October 3, 2006 || Mount Lemmon || Mount Lemmon Survey || — || align=right | 4.0 km || 
|-id=119 bgcolor=#d6d6d6
| 350119 ||  || — || October 20, 2001 || Socorro || LINEAR || EOS || align=right | 2.5 km || 
|-id=120 bgcolor=#E9E9E9
| 350120 ||  || — || April 10, 2010 || Mount Lemmon || Mount Lemmon Survey || — || align=right | 2.9 km || 
|-id=121 bgcolor=#d6d6d6
| 350121 ||  || — || September 18, 2006 || Kitt Peak || Spacewatch || — || align=right | 3.6 km || 
|-id=122 bgcolor=#d6d6d6
| 350122 ||  || — || October 3, 2000 || Anderson Mesa || LONEOS || MEL || align=right | 3.9 km || 
|-id=123 bgcolor=#d6d6d6
| 350123 ||  || — || October 16, 2006 || Kitt Peak || Spacewatch || VER || align=right | 2.4 km || 
|-id=124 bgcolor=#E9E9E9
| 350124 ||  || — || December 28, 2003 || Kitt Peak || Spacewatch || — || align=right | 2.7 km || 
|-id=125 bgcolor=#d6d6d6
| 350125 ||  || — || September 16, 2006 || Catalina || CSS || — || align=right | 3.3 km || 
|-id=126 bgcolor=#E9E9E9
| 350126 ||  || — || February 1, 2009 || Kitt Peak || Spacewatch || — || align=right | 1.8 km || 
|-id=127 bgcolor=#d6d6d6
| 350127 ||  || — || February 26, 2009 || Catalina || CSS || — || align=right | 3.3 km || 
|-id=128 bgcolor=#d6d6d6
| 350128 ||  || — || September 14, 2006 || Mauna Kea || J. Masiero || — || align=right | 2.3 km || 
|-id=129 bgcolor=#fefefe
| 350129 ||  || — || May 1, 2003 || Kitt Peak || Spacewatch || MAS || align=right data-sort-value="0.81" | 810 m || 
|-id=130 bgcolor=#d6d6d6
| 350130 ||  || — || January 16, 2008 || Kitt Peak || Spacewatch || — || align=right | 2.5 km || 
|-id=131 bgcolor=#d6d6d6
| 350131 ||  || — || February 8, 2002 || Socorro || LINEAR || — || align=right | 3.9 km || 
|-id=132 bgcolor=#E9E9E9
| 350132 ||  || — || March 11, 2005 || Mount Lemmon || Mount Lemmon Survey || — || align=right | 1.9 km || 
|-id=133 bgcolor=#d6d6d6
| 350133 ||  || — || September 16, 2006 || Kitt Peak || Spacewatch || — || align=right | 2.5 km || 
|-id=134 bgcolor=#fefefe
| 350134 ||  || — || October 4, 2004 || Kitt Peak || Spacewatch || — || align=right | 2.1 km || 
|-id=135 bgcolor=#E9E9E9
| 350135 ||  || — || April 2, 2005 || Mount Lemmon || Mount Lemmon Survey || — || align=right | 1.5 km || 
|-id=136 bgcolor=#d6d6d6
| 350136 ||  || — || September 27, 2006 || Kitt Peak || Spacewatch || HYG || align=right | 2.7 km || 
|-id=137 bgcolor=#fefefe
| 350137 ||  || — || January 23, 2006 || Kitt Peak || Spacewatch || V || align=right data-sort-value="0.85" | 850 m || 
|-id=138 bgcolor=#d6d6d6
| 350138 ||  || — || September 20, 2001 || Kitt Peak || Spacewatch || EOS || align=right | 1.9 km || 
|-id=139 bgcolor=#E9E9E9
| 350139 ||  || — || September 5, 2002 || Campo Imperatore || CINEOS || AER || align=right | 1.6 km || 
|-id=140 bgcolor=#d6d6d6
| 350140 ||  || — || April 21, 2009 || Mount Lemmon || Mount Lemmon Survey || — || align=right | 2.8 km || 
|-id=141 bgcolor=#d6d6d6
| 350141 ||  || — || December 12, 1996 || Kitt Peak || Spacewatch || — || align=right | 4.0 km || 
|-id=142 bgcolor=#d6d6d6
| 350142 ||  || — || October 4, 1996 || Kitt Peak || Spacewatch || — || align=right | 3.0 km || 
|-id=143 bgcolor=#d6d6d6
| 350143 ||  || — || April 23, 1998 || Socorro || LINEAR || — || align=right | 4.2 km || 
|-id=144 bgcolor=#d6d6d6
| 350144 ||  || — || August 29, 2005 || Kitt Peak || Spacewatch || — || align=right | 4.8 km || 
|-id=145 bgcolor=#E9E9E9
| 350145 ||  || — || August 12, 1997 || Kitt Peak || Spacewatch || WIT || align=right | 1.2 km || 
|-id=146 bgcolor=#d6d6d6
| 350146 ||  || — || March 29, 2009 || Kitt Peak || Spacewatch || EOS || align=right | 1.9 km || 
|-id=147 bgcolor=#E9E9E9
| 350147 ||  || — || March 13, 2005 || Kitt Peak || Spacewatch || — || align=right | 2.3 km || 
|-id=148 bgcolor=#E9E9E9
| 350148 ||  || — || November 7, 2007 || Kitt Peak || Spacewatch || AGN || align=right | 1.5 km || 
|-id=149 bgcolor=#d6d6d6
| 350149 ||  || — || September 17, 1995 || Kitt Peak || Spacewatch || — || align=right | 4.9 km || 
|-id=150 bgcolor=#d6d6d6
| 350150 ||  || — || July 3, 2011 || Mount Lemmon || Mount Lemmon Survey || — || align=right | 4.0 km || 
|-id=151 bgcolor=#d6d6d6
| 350151 ||  || — || March 31, 2009 || Mount Lemmon || Mount Lemmon Survey || — || align=right | 2.3 km || 
|-id=152 bgcolor=#d6d6d6
| 350152 ||  || — || December 19, 2007 || Mount Lemmon || Mount Lemmon Survey || EOS || align=right | 2.6 km || 
|-id=153 bgcolor=#d6d6d6
| 350153 ||  || — || December 14, 2001 || Socorro || LINEAR || — || align=right | 3.5 km || 
|-id=154 bgcolor=#d6d6d6
| 350154 ||  || — || November 12, 2006 || Mount Lemmon || Mount Lemmon Survey || — || align=right | 3.2 km || 
|-id=155 bgcolor=#d6d6d6
| 350155 ||  || — || September 30, 2003 || Kvistaberg || UDAS || HIL3:2 || align=right | 6.8 km || 
|-id=156 bgcolor=#d6d6d6
| 350156 ||  || — || August 31, 2005 || Palomar || NEAT || URS || align=right | 4.5 km || 
|-id=157 bgcolor=#E9E9E9
| 350157 ||  || — || September 26, 2006 || Kitt Peak || Spacewatch || — || align=right | 2.5 km || 
|-id=158 bgcolor=#d6d6d6
| 350158 ||  || — || November 19, 2007 || Kitt Peak || Spacewatch || 628 || align=right | 1.7 km || 
|-id=159 bgcolor=#d6d6d6
| 350159 ||  || — || July 6, 2005 || Kitt Peak || Spacewatch || — || align=right | 3.6 km || 
|-id=160 bgcolor=#d6d6d6
| 350160 ||  || — || July 21, 2006 || Mount Lemmon || Mount Lemmon Survey || — || align=right | 3.1 km || 
|-id=161 bgcolor=#d6d6d6
| 350161 ||  || — || August 4, 2005 || Palomar || NEAT || — || align=right | 3.7 km || 
|-id=162 bgcolor=#fefefe
| 350162 ||  || — || August 25, 2004 || Kitt Peak || Spacewatch || NYS || align=right data-sort-value="0.76" | 760 m || 
|-id=163 bgcolor=#d6d6d6
| 350163 ||  || — || October 23, 2006 || Catalina || CSS || EUP || align=right | 5.1 km || 
|-id=164 bgcolor=#d6d6d6
| 350164 ||  || — || July 7, 2005 || Kitt Peak || Spacewatch || — || align=right | 3.0 km || 
|-id=165 bgcolor=#d6d6d6
| 350165 ||  || — || September 16, 2006 || Kitt Peak || Spacewatch || CHA || align=right | 1.9 km || 
|-id=166 bgcolor=#d6d6d6
| 350166 ||  || — || October 2, 2000 || Kitt Peak || Spacewatch || VER || align=right | 3.4 km || 
|-id=167 bgcolor=#d6d6d6
| 350167 ||  || — || September 16, 2006 || Catalina || CSS || EOS || align=right | 2.2 km || 
|-id=168 bgcolor=#d6d6d6
| 350168 ||  || — || September 29, 2005 || Kitt Peak || Spacewatch || — || align=right | 4.1 km || 
|-id=169 bgcolor=#E9E9E9
| 350169 ||  || — || July 18, 2006 || Siding Spring || SSS || ADE || align=right | 3.5 km || 
|-id=170 bgcolor=#d6d6d6
| 350170 ||  || — || March 23, 2003 || Apache Point || SDSS || — || align=right | 3.2 km || 
|-id=171 bgcolor=#d6d6d6
| 350171 ||  || — || August 30, 2005 || Palomar || NEAT || — || align=right | 5.1 km || 
|-id=172 bgcolor=#d6d6d6
| 350172 ||  || — || December 15, 2001 || Apache Point || SDSS || — || align=right | 3.0 km || 
|-id=173 bgcolor=#d6d6d6
| 350173 Yoshidanaoki ||  ||  || September 25, 2006 || Mount Lemmon || Mount Lemmon Survey || — || align=right | 2.5 km || 
|-id=174 bgcolor=#d6d6d6
| 350174 ||  || — || July 29, 2005 || Palomar || NEAT || EOS || align=right | 2.6 km || 
|-id=175 bgcolor=#E9E9E9
| 350175 ||  || — || October 30, 2002 || Palomar || NEAT || AGN || align=right | 1.5 km || 
|-id=176 bgcolor=#d6d6d6
| 350176 ||  || — || March 1, 2004 || Kitt Peak || Spacewatch || CHA || align=right | 2.0 km || 
|-id=177 bgcolor=#d6d6d6
| 350177 ||  || — || August 29, 2005 || Kitt Peak || Spacewatch || THM || align=right | 2.6 km || 
|-id=178 bgcolor=#E9E9E9
| 350178 Eisleben ||  ||  || March 30, 1992 || Tautenburg Observatory || F. Börngen || — || align=right | 1.6 km || 
|-id=179 bgcolor=#C2FFFF
| 350179 ||  || — || May 16, 2004 || Kitt Peak || Spacewatch || L4 || align=right | 11 km || 
|-id=180 bgcolor=#d6d6d6
| 350180 ||  || — || September 28, 2006 || Mount Lemmon || Mount Lemmon Survey || — || align=right | 2.6 km || 
|-id=181 bgcolor=#d6d6d6
| 350181 ||  || — || November 11, 2006 || Kitt Peak || Spacewatch || — || align=right | 4.3 km || 
|-id=182 bgcolor=#E9E9E9
| 350182 ||  || — || May 30, 2005 || Siding Spring || SSS || MAR || align=right | 1.9 km || 
|-id=183 bgcolor=#d6d6d6
| 350183 ||  || — || October 13, 1998 || Kitt Peak || Spacewatch || 7:4 || align=right | 4.7 km || 
|-id=184 bgcolor=#d6d6d6
| 350184 ||  || — || August 29, 2005 || Palomar || NEAT || — || align=right | 3.9 km || 
|-id=185 bgcolor=#E9E9E9
| 350185 Linnell ||  ||  || June 3, 2006 || Mauna Kea || D. D. Balam || — || align=right | 1.2 km || 
|-id=186 bgcolor=#d6d6d6
| 350186 ||  || — || July 27, 2005 || Palomar || NEAT || — || align=right | 4.1 km || 
|-id=187 bgcolor=#d6d6d6
| 350187 ||  || — || February 6, 2008 || Catalina || CSS || — || align=right | 4.1 km || 
|-id=188 bgcolor=#d6d6d6
| 350188 ||  || — || December 23, 2001 || Kitt Peak || Spacewatch || — || align=right | 4.3 km || 
|-id=189 bgcolor=#d6d6d6
| 350189 ||  || — || September 20, 2001 || Apache Point || SDSS || — || align=right | 3.4 km || 
|-id=190 bgcolor=#d6d6d6
| 350190 ||  || — || April 11, 2003 || Kitt Peak || Spacewatch || — || align=right | 5.8 km || 
|-id=191 bgcolor=#C2FFFF
| 350191 ||  || — || January 19, 2002 || Kitt Peak || Spacewatch || L4 || align=right | 8.5 km || 
|-id=192 bgcolor=#C2FFFF
| 350192 ||  || — || February 9, 2002 || Kitt Peak || Spacewatch || L4 || align=right | 9.8 km || 
|-id=193 bgcolor=#C2FFFF
| 350193 ||  || — || October 31, 2010 || Catalina || CSS || L4 || align=right | 13 km || 
|-id=194 bgcolor=#d6d6d6
| 350194 ||  || — || October 22, 2005 || Palomar || NEAT || URS || align=right | 4.6 km || 
|-id=195 bgcolor=#d6d6d6
| 350195 ||  || — || July 29, 2005 || Palomar || NEAT || — || align=right | 4.1 km || 
|-id=196 bgcolor=#C2FFFF
| 350196 ||  || — || September 5, 2008 || Kitt Peak || Spacewatch || L4 || align=right | 10 km || 
|-id=197 bgcolor=#d6d6d6
| 350197 ||  || — || November 25, 2005 || Mount Lemmon || Mount Lemmon Survey || HYG || align=right | 3.3 km || 
|-id=198 bgcolor=#C2FFFF
| 350198 ||  || — || September 25, 2009 || Catalina || CSS || L4 || align=right | 12 km || 
|-id=199 bgcolor=#d6d6d6
| 350199 ||  || — || February 26, 2007 || Mount Lemmon || Mount Lemmon Survey || VER || align=right | 4.2 km || 
|-id=200 bgcolor=#E9E9E9
| 350200 ||  || — || November 20, 2006 || Kitt Peak || Spacewatch || DOR || align=right | 2.5 km || 
|}

350201–350300 

|-bgcolor=#d6d6d6
| 350201 ||  || — || January 16, 2005 || Catalina || CSS || LUT || align=right | 5.7 km || 
|-id=202 bgcolor=#C2FFFF
| 350202 ||  || — || October 13, 2002 || Palomar || NEAT || L5 || align=right | 16 km || 
|-id=203 bgcolor=#d6d6d6
| 350203 ||  || — || December 22, 2003 || Kitt Peak || Spacewatch || EOS || align=right | 2.8 km || 
|-id=204 bgcolor=#E9E9E9
| 350204 ||  || — || October 31, 1999 || Socorro || LINEAR || — || align=right | 3.6 km || 
|-id=205 bgcolor=#d6d6d6
| 350205 ||  || — || May 25, 2006 || Mauna Kea || P. A. Wiegert || — || align=right | 4.1 km || 
|-id=206 bgcolor=#d6d6d6
| 350206 ||  || — || September 21, 2001 || Socorro || LINEAR || EOS || align=right | 2.0 km || 
|-id=207 bgcolor=#E9E9E9
| 350207 ||  || — || January 28, 2006 || Kitt Peak || Spacewatch || — || align=right | 2.8 km || 
|-id=208 bgcolor=#fefefe
| 350208 ||  || — || August 31, 2005 || Kitt Peak || Spacewatch || — || align=right data-sort-value="0.74" | 740 m || 
|-id=209 bgcolor=#fefefe
| 350209 ||  || — || December 22, 2005 || Kitt Peak || Spacewatch || MAS || align=right | 1.1 km || 
|-id=210 bgcolor=#fefefe
| 350210 ||  || — || December 5, 2002 || Socorro || LINEAR || V || align=right data-sort-value="0.77" | 770 m || 
|-id=211 bgcolor=#d6d6d6
| 350211 ||  || — || April 10, 2005 || Kitt Peak || Spacewatch || — || align=right | 2.5 km || 
|-id=212 bgcolor=#C2FFFF
| 350212 ||  || — || October 24, 2005 || Mauna Kea || A. Boattini || L5 || align=right | 9.5 km || 
|-id=213 bgcolor=#E9E9E9
| 350213 ||  || — || July 5, 2003 || Kitt Peak || Spacewatch || MAR || align=right | 1.4 km || 
|-id=214 bgcolor=#fefefe
| 350214 ||  || — || November 16, 2009 || Kitt Peak || Spacewatch || — || align=right data-sort-value="0.78" | 780 m || 
|-id=215 bgcolor=#d6d6d6
| 350215 ||  || — || August 16, 2006 || Palomar || NEAT || VER || align=right | 3.4 km || 
|-id=216 bgcolor=#d6d6d6
| 350216 ||  || — || October 20, 2007 || Mount Lemmon || Mount Lemmon Survey || — || align=right | 3.0 km || 
|-id=217 bgcolor=#E9E9E9
| 350217 ||  || — || January 14, 2010 || WISE || WISE || — || align=right | 4.4 km || 
|-id=218 bgcolor=#d6d6d6
| 350218 ||  || — || September 18, 2006 || Kitt Peak || Spacewatch || — || align=right | 3.1 km || 
|-id=219 bgcolor=#E9E9E9
| 350219 ||  || — || May 3, 2006 || Mount Lemmon || Mount Lemmon Survey || — || align=right | 2.7 km || 
|-id=220 bgcolor=#fefefe
| 350220 ||  || — || October 13, 1999 || Apache Point || SDSS || FLO || align=right data-sort-value="0.61" | 610 m || 
|-id=221 bgcolor=#fefefe
| 350221 ||  || — || December 30, 2005 || Kitt Peak || Spacewatch || MAS || align=right data-sort-value="0.76" | 760 m || 
|-id=222 bgcolor=#d6d6d6
| 350222 ||  || — || September 22, 2006 || Catalina || CSS || — || align=right | 3.8 km || 
|-id=223 bgcolor=#E9E9E9
| 350223 ||  || — || November 17, 2004 || Campo Imperatore || CINEOS || MAR || align=right | 2.0 km || 
|-id=224 bgcolor=#fefefe
| 350224 ||  || — || August 29, 2005 || Palomar || NEAT || V || align=right data-sort-value="0.56" | 560 m || 
|-id=225 bgcolor=#E9E9E9
| 350225 ||  || — || September 18, 1995 || Kitt Peak || Spacewatch || — || align=right | 1.7 km || 
|-id=226 bgcolor=#E9E9E9
| 350226 ||  || — || October 19, 2003 || Palomar || NEAT || — || align=right | 4.1 km || 
|-id=227 bgcolor=#E9E9E9
| 350227 ||  || — || September 14, 2007 || Anderson Mesa || LONEOS || HOF || align=right | 2.8 km || 
|-id=228 bgcolor=#E9E9E9
| 350228 ||  || — || April 8, 2002 || Kitt Peak || Spacewatch || — || align=right | 1.5 km || 
|-id=229 bgcolor=#d6d6d6
| 350229 ||  || — || October 6, 1996 || Kitt Peak || Spacewatch || — || align=right | 2.1 km || 
|-id=230 bgcolor=#E9E9E9
| 350230 ||  || — || October 7, 2008 || Catalina || CSS || JUN || align=right | 1.4 km || 
|-id=231 bgcolor=#fefefe
| 350231 ||  || — || December 4, 1999 || Kitt Peak || Spacewatch || — || align=right data-sort-value="0.70" | 700 m || 
|-id=232 bgcolor=#d6d6d6
| 350232 ||  || — || December 15, 2001 || Socorro || LINEAR || HYG || align=right | 3.9 km || 
|-id=233 bgcolor=#E9E9E9
| 350233 ||  || — || September 18, 2003 || Kitt Peak || Spacewatch || — || align=right | 1.4 km || 
|-id=234 bgcolor=#d6d6d6
| 350234 ||  || — || April 25, 2004 || Kitt Peak || Spacewatch || EOS || align=right | 2.8 km || 
|-id=235 bgcolor=#E9E9E9
| 350235 ||  || — || October 20, 2003 || Kitt Peak || Spacewatch || HNS || align=right | 1.4 km || 
|-id=236 bgcolor=#E9E9E9
| 350236 ||  || — || April 26, 2001 || Kitt Peak || Spacewatch || — || align=right | 2.8 km || 
|-id=237 bgcolor=#E9E9E9
| 350237 ||  || — || September 26, 2003 || Apache Point || SDSS || — || align=right | 1.4 km || 
|-id=238 bgcolor=#d6d6d6
| 350238 ||  || — || March 23, 2004 || Kitt Peak || Spacewatch || VER || align=right | 3.5 km || 
|-id=239 bgcolor=#fefefe
| 350239 ||  || — || September 20, 2008 || Mount Lemmon || Mount Lemmon Survey || MAS || align=right data-sort-value="0.77" | 770 m || 
|-id=240 bgcolor=#E9E9E9
| 350240 ||  || — || September 18, 2003 || Kitt Peak || Spacewatch || — || align=right | 1.8 km || 
|-id=241 bgcolor=#E9E9E9
| 350241 ||  || — || September 19, 2003 || Palomar || NEAT || — || align=right | 2.2 km || 
|-id=242 bgcolor=#E9E9E9
| 350242 ||  || — || September 18, 2003 || Kitt Peak || Spacewatch || — || align=right | 1.9 km || 
|-id=243 bgcolor=#FA8072
| 350243 ||  || — || April 22, 2002 || Palomar || NEAT || — || align=right data-sort-value="0.91" | 910 m || 
|-id=244 bgcolor=#E9E9E9
| 350244 ||  || — || October 19, 2003 || Kitt Peak || Spacewatch || AEO || align=right | 1.3 km || 
|-id=245 bgcolor=#fefefe
| 350245 ||  || — || December 18, 2001 || Socorro || LINEAR || NYS || align=right data-sort-value="0.86" | 860 m || 
|-id=246 bgcolor=#fefefe
| 350246 ||  || — || July 13, 2001 || Palomar || NEAT || — || align=right | 1.2 km || 
|-id=247 bgcolor=#fefefe
| 350247 ||  || — || October 24, 1995 || Kitt Peak || Spacewatch || — || align=right data-sort-value="0.71" | 710 m || 
|-id=248 bgcolor=#fefefe
| 350248 ||  || — || September 23, 2005 || Kitt Peak || Spacewatch || — || align=right data-sort-value="0.75" | 750 m || 
|-id=249 bgcolor=#E9E9E9
| 350249 ||  || — || September 9, 2008 || Mount Lemmon || Mount Lemmon Survey || — || align=right | 2.2 km || 
|-id=250 bgcolor=#d6d6d6
| 350250 ||  || — || September 20, 2006 || Kitt Peak || Spacewatch || HYG || align=right | 2.8 km || 
|-id=251 bgcolor=#fefefe
| 350251 ||  || — || June 29, 2001 || Anderson Mesa || LONEOS || — || align=right data-sort-value="0.96" | 960 m || 
|-id=252 bgcolor=#E9E9E9
| 350252 ||  || — || September 19, 2003 || Campo Imperatore || CINEOS || — || align=right | 2.4 km || 
|-id=253 bgcolor=#E9E9E9
| 350253 ||  || — || November 16, 2003 || Catalina || CSS || — || align=right | 2.7 km || 
|-id=254 bgcolor=#E9E9E9
| 350254 ||  || — || April 8, 2006 || Kitt Peak || Spacewatch || — || align=right | 2.1 km || 
|-id=255 bgcolor=#d6d6d6
| 350255 ||  || — || May 7, 2010 || Mount Lemmon || Mount Lemmon Survey || — || align=right | 3.4 km || 
|-id=256 bgcolor=#d6d6d6
| 350256 ||  || — || November 19, 2001 || Socorro || LINEAR || — || align=right | 4.8 km || 
|-id=257 bgcolor=#fefefe
| 350257 ||  || — || May 15, 2004 || Siding Spring || SSS || — || align=right | 1.1 km || 
|-id=258 bgcolor=#fefefe
| 350258 ||  || — || February 21, 2007 || Mount Lemmon || Mount Lemmon Survey || — || align=right data-sort-value="0.60" | 600 m || 
|-id=259 bgcolor=#fefefe
| 350259 ||  || — || September 4, 2008 || Kitt Peak || Spacewatch || fast? || align=right | 1.00 km || 
|-id=260 bgcolor=#E9E9E9
| 350260 ||  || — || December 14, 1999 || Socorro || LINEAR || — || align=right | 2.1 km || 
|-id=261 bgcolor=#d6d6d6
| 350261 ||  || — || February 15, 2004 || Socorro || LINEAR || — || align=right | 4.8 km || 
|-id=262 bgcolor=#E9E9E9
| 350262 ||  || — || August 25, 2003 || Bergisch Gladbac || W. Bickel || — || align=right | 2.1 km || 
|-id=263 bgcolor=#fefefe
| 350263 ||  || — || April 24, 2004 || Kitt Peak || Spacewatch || — || align=right | 1.7 km || 
|-id=264 bgcolor=#E9E9E9
| 350264 ||  || — || November 21, 2003 || Socorro || LINEAR || — || align=right | 3.2 km || 
|-id=265 bgcolor=#E9E9E9
| 350265 ||  || — || October 27, 2003 || Kitt Peak || Spacewatch || — || align=right | 2.9 km || 
|-id=266 bgcolor=#d6d6d6
| 350266 ||  || — || July 2, 2011 || Kitt Peak || Spacewatch || — || align=right | 4.5 km || 
|-id=267 bgcolor=#E9E9E9
| 350267 ||  || — || March 18, 2010 || Mount Lemmon || Mount Lemmon Survey || WIT || align=right | 1.3 km || 
|-id=268 bgcolor=#d6d6d6
| 350268 ||  || — || August 22, 2007 || Kitt Peak || Spacewatch || — || align=right | 2.8 km || 
|-id=269 bgcolor=#d6d6d6
| 350269 ||  || — || April 28, 2004 || Kitt Peak || Spacewatch || — || align=right | 3.2 km || 
|-id=270 bgcolor=#d6d6d6
| 350270 ||  || — || September 19, 2006 || Kitt Peak || Spacewatch || EOS || align=right | 2.0 km || 
|-id=271 bgcolor=#d6d6d6
| 350271 ||  || — || April 7, 2005 || Kitt Peak || Spacewatch || NAE || align=right | 2.5 km || 
|-id=272 bgcolor=#fefefe
| 350272 ||  || — || December 10, 2006 || Kitt Peak || Spacewatch || — || align=right data-sort-value="0.89" | 890 m || 
|-id=273 bgcolor=#d6d6d6
| 350273 ||  || — || October 21, 2001 || Kitt Peak || Spacewatch || — || align=right | 3.3 km || 
|-id=274 bgcolor=#E9E9E9
| 350274 ||  || — || December 14, 2004 || Kitt Peak || Spacewatch || — || align=right | 4.4 km || 
|-id=275 bgcolor=#E9E9E9
| 350275 ||  || — || September 26, 1998 || Socorro || LINEAR || — || align=right | 2.9 km || 
|-id=276 bgcolor=#fefefe
| 350276 ||  || — || July 19, 2004 || Siding Spring || SSS || H || align=right data-sort-value="0.94" | 940 m || 
|-id=277 bgcolor=#E9E9E9
| 350277 ||  || — || October 9, 1999 || Socorro || LINEAR || JUN || align=right | 1.3 km || 
|-id=278 bgcolor=#fefefe
| 350278 ||  || — || September 29, 2005 || Catalina || CSS || PHO || align=right | 3.0 km || 
|-id=279 bgcolor=#E9E9E9
| 350279 ||  || — || October 7, 2008 || Catalina || CSS || EUN || align=right | 4.7 km || 
|-id=280 bgcolor=#E9E9E9
| 350280 ||  || — || September 12, 1994 || Kitt Peak || Spacewatch || HEN || align=right | 1.1 km || 
|-id=281 bgcolor=#fefefe
| 350281 ||  || — || September 22, 2001 || Kitt Peak || Spacewatch || NYS || align=right data-sort-value="0.63" | 630 m || 
|-id=282 bgcolor=#E9E9E9
| 350282 ||  || — || January 13, 2005 || Kitt Peak || Spacewatch || — || align=right | 1.8 km || 
|-id=283 bgcolor=#E9E9E9
| 350283 ||  || — || February 4, 2009 || Catalina || CSS || — || align=right | 2.7 km || 
|-id=284 bgcolor=#E9E9E9
| 350284 ||  || — || September 27, 2003 || Socorro || LINEAR || — || align=right | 1.7 km || 
|-id=285 bgcolor=#d6d6d6
| 350285 ||  || — || September 12, 2001 || Kitt Peak || Spacewatch || EOS || align=right | 2.0 km || 
|-id=286 bgcolor=#E9E9E9
| 350286 ||  || — || September 29, 2003 || Kitt Peak || Spacewatch || — || align=right | 1.8 km || 
|-id=287 bgcolor=#E9E9E9
| 350287 ||  || — || August 19, 2003 || Campo Imperatore || CINEOS || — || align=right | 1.6 km || 
|-id=288 bgcolor=#d6d6d6
| 350288 ||  || — || November 20, 2001 || Socorro || LINEAR || — || align=right | 3.2 km || 
|-id=289 bgcolor=#d6d6d6
| 350289 ||  || — || October 19, 2006 || Mount Lemmon || Mount Lemmon Survey || — || align=right | 3.5 km || 
|-id=290 bgcolor=#d6d6d6
| 350290 ||  || — || April 4, 2005 || Mount Lemmon || Mount Lemmon Survey || — || align=right | 2.8 km || 
|-id=291 bgcolor=#E9E9E9
| 350291 ||  || — || March 12, 2010 || Mount Lemmon || Mount Lemmon Survey || — || align=right | 2.0 km || 
|-id=292 bgcolor=#d6d6d6
| 350292 ||  || — || March 13, 2005 || Catalina || CSS || — || align=right | 3.5 km || 
|-id=293 bgcolor=#E9E9E9
| 350293 ||  || — || October 2, 1999 || Ondřejov || L. Kotková || — || align=right | 1.5 km || 
|-id=294 bgcolor=#fefefe
| 350294 ||  || — || September 12, 2001 || Socorro || LINEAR || V || align=right data-sort-value="0.88" | 880 m || 
|-id=295 bgcolor=#d6d6d6
| 350295 ||  || — || January 24, 2003 || Palomar || NEAT || — || align=right | 3.5 km || 
|-id=296 bgcolor=#d6d6d6
| 350296 ||  || — || June 11, 2010 || Mount Lemmon || Mount Lemmon Survey || EOS || align=right | 2.7 km || 
|-id=297 bgcolor=#fefefe
| 350297 ||  || — || July 16, 2001 || Anderson Mesa || LONEOS || — || align=right data-sort-value="0.99" | 990 m || 
|-id=298 bgcolor=#d6d6d6
| 350298 ||  || — || September 21, 2001 || Palomar || NEAT || TIR || align=right | 3.7 km || 
|-id=299 bgcolor=#E9E9E9
| 350299 ||  || — || November 5, 1991 || Kitt Peak || Spacewatch || — || align=right | 1.6 km || 
|-id=300 bgcolor=#E9E9E9
| 350300 ||  || — || October 18, 2003 || Kitt Peak || Spacewatch || — || align=right | 3.6 km || 
|}

350301–350400 

|-bgcolor=#fefefe
| 350301 ||  || — || September 20, 2001 || Socorro || LINEAR || FLO || align=right data-sort-value="0.70" | 700 m || 
|-id=302 bgcolor=#fefefe
| 350302 ||  || — || March 9, 2007 || Kitt Peak || Spacewatch || — || align=right data-sort-value="0.90" | 900 m || 
|-id=303 bgcolor=#fefefe
| 350303 ||  || — || June 18, 2005 || Mount Lemmon || Mount Lemmon Survey || — || align=right data-sort-value="0.78" | 780 m || 
|-id=304 bgcolor=#fefefe
| 350304 ||  || — || May 20, 2005 || Mount Lemmon || Mount Lemmon Survey || — || align=right data-sort-value="0.81" | 810 m || 
|-id=305 bgcolor=#d6d6d6
| 350305 ||  || — || May 14, 2004 || Kitt Peak || Spacewatch || — || align=right | 3.2 km || 
|-id=306 bgcolor=#E9E9E9
| 350306 ||  || — || January 19, 2001 || Kitt Peak || Spacewatch || — || align=right | 1.2 km || 
|-id=307 bgcolor=#E9E9E9
| 350307 ||  || — || December 20, 1995 || Kitt Peak || Spacewatch || — || align=right | 1.5 km || 
|-id=308 bgcolor=#d6d6d6
| 350308 ||  || — || March 3, 2000 || Apache Point || SDSS || KAR || align=right | 1.4 km || 
|-id=309 bgcolor=#fefefe
| 350309 ||  || — || February 6, 2002 || Kitt Peak || Spacewatch || MAS || align=right data-sort-value="0.71" | 710 m || 
|-id=310 bgcolor=#E9E9E9
| 350310 ||  || — || October 25, 2003 || Kitt Peak || Spacewatch || WIT || align=right data-sort-value="0.88" | 880 m || 
|-id=311 bgcolor=#fefefe
| 350311 ||  || — || November 6, 2005 || Mount Lemmon || Mount Lemmon Survey || V || align=right data-sort-value="0.68" | 680 m || 
|-id=312 bgcolor=#E9E9E9
| 350312 ||  || — || January 26, 2006 || Mount Lemmon || Mount Lemmon Survey || — || align=right | 1.3 km || 
|-id=313 bgcolor=#d6d6d6
| 350313 ||  || — || May 7, 2005 || Kitt Peak || Spacewatch || BRA || align=right | 1.6 km || 
|-id=314 bgcolor=#d6d6d6
| 350314 ||  || — || October 30, 2007 || Kitt Peak || Spacewatch || — || align=right | 3.6 km || 
|-id=315 bgcolor=#d6d6d6
| 350315 ||  || — || September 26, 2001 || Socorro || LINEAR || — || align=right | 2.9 km || 
|-id=316 bgcolor=#fefefe
| 350316 ||  || — || July 10, 2004 || Palomar || NEAT || — || align=right | 1.1 km || 
|-id=317 bgcolor=#E9E9E9
| 350317 ||  || — || September 26, 2003 || Apache Point || SDSS || — || align=right | 1.6 km || 
|-id=318 bgcolor=#d6d6d6
| 350318 ||  || — || September 17, 1995 || Kitt Peak || Spacewatch || THM || align=right | 2.1 km || 
|-id=319 bgcolor=#E9E9E9
| 350319 ||  || — || November 3, 2004 || Kitt Peak || Spacewatch || — || align=right data-sort-value="0.87" | 870 m || 
|-id=320 bgcolor=#E9E9E9
| 350320 ||  || — || September 21, 2003 || Anderson Mesa || LONEOS || — || align=right | 2.1 km || 
|-id=321 bgcolor=#E9E9E9
| 350321 ||  || — || March 18, 2010 || Kitt Peak || Spacewatch || HOF || align=right | 2.7 km || 
|-id=322 bgcolor=#fefefe
| 350322 ||  || — || October 7, 2004 || Kitt Peak || Spacewatch || — || align=right data-sort-value="0.73" | 730 m || 
|-id=323 bgcolor=#fefefe
| 350323 ||  || — || February 12, 2002 || Socorro || LINEAR || — || align=right data-sort-value="0.84" | 840 m || 
|-id=324 bgcolor=#fefefe
| 350324 ||  || — || December 12, 2009 || Pla D'Arguines || R. Ferrando || — || align=right data-sort-value="0.80" | 800 m || 
|-id=325 bgcolor=#d6d6d6
| 350325 ||  || — || December 24, 2005 || Kitt Peak || Spacewatch || SHU3:2 || align=right | 5.0 km || 
|-id=326 bgcolor=#d6d6d6
| 350326 ||  || — || September 20, 2001 || Socorro || LINEAR || — || align=right | 2.7 km || 
|-id=327 bgcolor=#d6d6d6
| 350327 ||  || — || April 20, 1993 || Kitt Peak || Spacewatch || CRO || align=right | 3.5 km || 
|-id=328 bgcolor=#fefefe
| 350328 ||  || — || August 26, 2005 || Palomar || NEAT || — || align=right data-sort-value="0.98" | 980 m || 
|-id=329 bgcolor=#E9E9E9
| 350329 ||  || — || April 30, 2006 || Kitt Peak || Spacewatch || BRU || align=right | 3.2 km || 
|-id=330 bgcolor=#E9E9E9
| 350330 ||  || — || September 14, 2007 || Mount Lemmon || Mount Lemmon Survey || HEN || align=right | 1.3 km || 
|-id=331 bgcolor=#E9E9E9
| 350331 ||  || — || September 5, 1999 || Anderson Mesa || LONEOS || — || align=right | 1.3 km || 
|-id=332 bgcolor=#d6d6d6
| 350332 ||  || — || November 10, 1996 || Kitt Peak || Spacewatch || — || align=right | 2.5 km || 
|-id=333 bgcolor=#E9E9E9
| 350333 ||  || — || November 1, 1999 || Kitt Peak || Spacewatch || — || align=right | 1.7 km || 
|-id=334 bgcolor=#E9E9E9
| 350334 ||  || — || September 10, 2007 || Catalina || CSS || — || align=right | 4.0 km || 
|-id=335 bgcolor=#d6d6d6
| 350335 ||  || — || February 22, 2003 || Anderson Mesa || LONEOS || THM || align=right | 2.4 km || 
|-id=336 bgcolor=#E9E9E9
| 350336 ||  || — || September 26, 2003 || Desert Eagle || W. K. Y. Yeung || MRX || align=right data-sort-value="0.83" | 830 m || 
|-id=337 bgcolor=#E9E9E9
| 350337 ||  || — || March 16, 2005 || Mount Lemmon || Mount Lemmon Survey || HOF || align=right | 2.6 km || 
|-id=338 bgcolor=#E9E9E9
| 350338 ||  || — || November 14, 1995 || Kitt Peak || Spacewatch || HEN || align=right | 1.4 km || 
|-id=339 bgcolor=#d6d6d6
| 350339 ||  || — || April 16, 2005 || Kitt Peak || Spacewatch || — || align=right | 2.6 km || 
|-id=340 bgcolor=#d6d6d6
| 350340 ||  || — || February 25, 2009 || Catalina || CSS || — || align=right | 2.4 km || 
|-id=341 bgcolor=#E9E9E9
| 350341 ||  || — || November 23, 2003 || Kitt Peak || Spacewatch || — || align=right | 1.9 km || 
|-id=342 bgcolor=#d6d6d6
| 350342 ||  || — || October 16, 2006 || Catalina || CSS || HYG || align=right | 4.1 km || 
|-id=343 bgcolor=#E9E9E9
| 350343 ||  || — || May 18, 2010 || WISE || WISE || — || align=right | 4.1 km || 
|-id=344 bgcolor=#E9E9E9
| 350344 ||  || — || November 6, 1999 || Eskridge || G. Bell, G. Hug || — || align=right | 2.0 km || 
|-id=345 bgcolor=#d6d6d6
| 350345 ||  || — || March 18, 2004 || Kitt Peak || Spacewatch || — || align=right | 3.4 km || 
|-id=346 bgcolor=#E9E9E9
| 350346 ||  || — || October 10, 1999 || Kitt Peak || Spacewatch || — || align=right | 1.5 km || 
|-id=347 bgcolor=#fefefe
| 350347 ||  || — || October 10, 2002 || Palomar || NEAT || FLO || align=right data-sort-value="0.58" | 580 m || 
|-id=348 bgcolor=#d6d6d6
| 350348 ||  || — || December 6, 2007 || Mount Lemmon || Mount Lemmon Survey || — || align=right | 3.0 km || 
|-id=349 bgcolor=#E9E9E9
| 350349 ||  || — || December 19, 1995 || Kitt Peak || Spacewatch || — || align=right | 1.8 km || 
|-id=350 bgcolor=#fefefe
| 350350 ||  || — || January 7, 2006 || Kitt Peak || Spacewatch || NYS || align=right data-sort-value="0.92" | 920 m || 
|-id=351 bgcolor=#d6d6d6
| 350351 ||  || — || November 24, 2001 || Socorro || LINEAR || — || align=right | 4.1 km || 
|-id=352 bgcolor=#E9E9E9
| 350352 ||  || — || December 14, 2003 || Kitt Peak || Spacewatch || — || align=right | 2.5 km || 
|-id=353 bgcolor=#E9E9E9
| 350353 ||  || — || October 9, 2007 || Socorro || LINEAR || — || align=right | 2.9 km || 
|-id=354 bgcolor=#fefefe
| 350354 ||  || — || October 10, 2005 || Catalina || CSS || — || align=right data-sort-value="0.85" | 850 m || 
|-id=355 bgcolor=#fefefe
| 350355 ||  || — || December 17, 2001 || Kitt Peak || Spacewatch || — || align=right data-sort-value="0.69" | 690 m || 
|-id=356 bgcolor=#E9E9E9
| 350356 ||  || — || November 8, 2008 || Mount Lemmon || Mount Lemmon Survey || — || align=right | 1.9 km || 
|-id=357 bgcolor=#d6d6d6
| 350357 ||  || — || January 27, 2003 || Socorro || LINEAR || — || align=right | 4.1 km || 
|-id=358 bgcolor=#d6d6d6
| 350358 ||  || — || January 15, 2004 || Kitt Peak || Spacewatch || CHA || align=right | 1.8 km || 
|-id=359 bgcolor=#E9E9E9
| 350359 ||  || — || October 2, 2003 || Kitt Peak || Spacewatch || — || align=right | 1.7 km || 
|-id=360 bgcolor=#fefefe
| 350360 ||  || — || September 26, 2001 || Socorro || LINEAR || NYS || align=right data-sort-value="0.76" | 760 m || 
|-id=361 bgcolor=#fefefe
| 350361 ||  || — || February 17, 2007 || Mount Lemmon || Mount Lemmon Survey || — || align=right | 2.2 km || 
|-id=362 bgcolor=#E9E9E9
| 350362 ||  || — || October 7, 2008 || Mount Lemmon || Mount Lemmon Survey || — || align=right | 3.0 km || 
|-id=363 bgcolor=#d6d6d6
| 350363 ||  || — || December 19, 2003 || Kitt Peak || Spacewatch || SAN || align=right | 2.0 km || 
|-id=364 bgcolor=#d6d6d6
| 350364 ||  || — || August 20, 2006 || Palomar || NEAT || EOS || align=right | 2.6 km || 
|-id=365 bgcolor=#fefefe
| 350365 ||  || — || March 9, 2003 || Kitt Peak || Spacewatch || V || align=right data-sort-value="0.76" | 760 m || 
|-id=366 bgcolor=#d6d6d6
| 350366 ||  || — || February 12, 2010 || WISE || WISE || — || align=right | 5.1 km || 
|-id=367 bgcolor=#d6d6d6
| 350367 ||  || — || November 11, 2001 || Kitt Peak || Spacewatch || — || align=right | 3.1 km || 
|-id=368 bgcolor=#E9E9E9
| 350368 ||  || — || November 30, 2008 || Kitt Peak || Spacewatch || — || align=right | 1.3 km || 
|-id=369 bgcolor=#fefefe
| 350369 ||  || — || December 30, 2005 || Kitt Peak || Spacewatch || NYS || align=right data-sort-value="0.91" | 910 m || 
|-id=370 bgcolor=#E9E9E9
| 350370 ||  || — || October 22, 1998 || Caussols || ODAS || WIT || align=right | 1.4 km || 
|-id=371 bgcolor=#fefefe
| 350371 ||  || — || October 27, 2005 || Kitt Peak || Spacewatch || — || align=right data-sort-value="0.71" | 710 m || 
|-id=372 bgcolor=#d6d6d6
| 350372 ||  || — || October 3, 2006 || Mount Lemmon || Mount Lemmon Survey || — || align=right | 2.9 km || 
|-id=373 bgcolor=#fefefe
| 350373 ||  || — || July 29, 2008 || La Sagra || OAM Obs. || NYS || align=right data-sort-value="0.72" | 720 m || 
|-id=374 bgcolor=#E9E9E9
| 350374 ||  || — || November 23, 1998 || Kitt Peak || Spacewatch || HOF || align=right | 2.8 km || 
|-id=375 bgcolor=#fefefe
| 350375 ||  || — || November 30, 2005 || Kitt Peak || Spacewatch || NYS || align=right data-sort-value="0.77" | 770 m || 
|-id=376 bgcolor=#E9E9E9
| 350376 ||  || — || September 7, 1999 || Socorro || LINEAR || — || align=right | 1.4 km || 
|-id=377 bgcolor=#E9E9E9
| 350377 ||  || — || September 19, 2003 || Kitt Peak || Spacewatch || — || align=right | 1.6 km || 
|-id=378 bgcolor=#fefefe
| 350378 ||  || — || January 5, 2003 || Socorro || LINEAR || — || align=right | 1.1 km || 
|-id=379 bgcolor=#fefefe
| 350379 ||  || — || June 4, 2003 || Kitt Peak || Spacewatch || NYS || align=right data-sort-value="0.98" | 980 m || 
|-id=380 bgcolor=#d6d6d6
| 350380 ||  || — || March 16, 2004 || Catalina || CSS || — || align=right | 3.6 km || 
|-id=381 bgcolor=#fefefe
| 350381 ||  || — || December 18, 2001 || Socorro || LINEAR || MAS || align=right data-sort-value="0.82" | 820 m || 
|-id=382 bgcolor=#E9E9E9
| 350382 ||  || — || November 21, 2003 || Junk Bond || D. Healy || — || align=right | 2.8 km || 
|-id=383 bgcolor=#E9E9E9
| 350383 ||  || — || January 17, 2005 || Kitt Peak || Spacewatch || — || align=right | 1.4 km || 
|-id=384 bgcolor=#d6d6d6
| 350384 ||  || — || August 31, 2002 || Kitt Peak || Spacewatch || KOR || align=right | 1.4 km || 
|-id=385 bgcolor=#E9E9E9
| 350385 ||  || — || October 12, 1998 || Kitt Peak || Spacewatch || — || align=right | 2.4 km || 
|-id=386 bgcolor=#E9E9E9
| 350386 ||  || — || February 5, 2005 || Palomar || NEAT || EUN || align=right | 1.7 km || 
|-id=387 bgcolor=#E9E9E9
| 350387 ||  || — || April 15, 1997 || Kitt Peak || Spacewatch || WIT || align=right | 1.2 km || 
|-id=388 bgcolor=#fefefe
| 350388 ||  || — || October 3, 1997 || Caussols || ODAS || NYS || align=right data-sort-value="0.58" | 580 m || 
|-id=389 bgcolor=#d6d6d6
| 350389 ||  || — || October 10, 2007 || Mount Lemmon || Mount Lemmon Survey || EOS || align=right | 1.7 km || 
|-id=390 bgcolor=#fefefe
| 350390 ||  || — || October 6, 2008 || Mount Lemmon || Mount Lemmon Survey || — || align=right | 1.4 km || 
|-id=391 bgcolor=#E9E9E9
| 350391 ||  || — || November 20, 2008 || Kitt Peak || Spacewatch || — || align=right | 3.5 km || 
|-id=392 bgcolor=#fefefe
| 350392 ||  || — || September 26, 2005 || Goodricke-Pigott || R. A. Tucker || FLO || align=right data-sort-value="0.77" | 770 m || 
|-id=393 bgcolor=#d6d6d6
| 350393 ||  || — || October 23, 2006 || Kitt Peak || Spacewatch || — || align=right | 3.2 km || 
|-id=394 bgcolor=#E9E9E9
| 350394 ||  || — || December 31, 2008 || Catalina || CSS || GEF || align=right | 1.3 km || 
|-id=395 bgcolor=#d6d6d6
| 350395 ||  || — || September 25, 2006 || Mount Lemmon || Mount Lemmon Survey || — || align=right | 3.3 km || 
|-id=396 bgcolor=#E9E9E9
| 350396 ||  || — || April 9, 2005 || Mount Lemmon || Mount Lemmon Survey || MRX || align=right | 1.4 km || 
|-id=397 bgcolor=#fefefe
| 350397 ||  || — || April 22, 2007 || Mount Lemmon || Mount Lemmon Survey || — || align=right data-sort-value="0.94" | 940 m || 
|-id=398 bgcolor=#E9E9E9
| 350398 ||  || — || September 29, 2003 || Kitt Peak || Spacewatch || HEN || align=right data-sort-value="0.96" | 960 m || 
|-id=399 bgcolor=#E9E9E9
| 350399 ||  || — || December 19, 1998 || Kitt Peak || Spacewatch || — || align=right | 3.3 km || 
|-id=400 bgcolor=#E9E9E9
| 350400 ||  || — || October 27, 2008 || Kitt Peak || Spacewatch || — || align=right | 1.4 km || 
|}

350401–350500 

|-bgcolor=#E9E9E9
| 350401 ||  || — || December 11, 2004 || Kitt Peak || Spacewatch || — || align=right | 1.6 km || 
|-id=402 bgcolor=#d6d6d6
| 350402 ||  || — || February 11, 2004 || Kitt Peak || Spacewatch || KOR || align=right | 1.4 km || 
|-id=403 bgcolor=#d6d6d6
| 350403 ||  || — || November 4, 2007 || Kitt Peak || Spacewatch || CHA || align=right | 1.6 km || 
|-id=404 bgcolor=#fefefe
| 350404 ||  || — || August 12, 1999 || Anderson Mesa || LONEOS || — || align=right | 1.1 km || 
|-id=405 bgcolor=#E9E9E9
| 350405 ||  || — || September 30, 2003 || Kitt Peak || Spacewatch || — || align=right | 1.8 km || 
|-id=406 bgcolor=#E9E9E9
| 350406 ||  || — || January 15, 2005 || Kitt Peak || Spacewatch || HEN || align=right | 1.1 km || 
|-id=407 bgcolor=#fefefe
| 350407 ||  || — || December 4, 2005 || Kitt Peak || Spacewatch || — || align=right data-sort-value="0.90" | 900 m || 
|-id=408 bgcolor=#E9E9E9
| 350408 ||  || — || November 30, 1999 || Kitt Peak || Spacewatch || — || align=right | 1.9 km || 
|-id=409 bgcolor=#E9E9E9
| 350409 ||  || — || September 12, 2007 || Mount Lemmon || Mount Lemmon Survey || — || align=right | 1.9 km || 
|-id=410 bgcolor=#E9E9E9
| 350410 ||  || — || September 15, 1998 || Kitt Peak || Spacewatch || — || align=right | 2.2 km || 
|-id=411 bgcolor=#E9E9E9
| 350411 ||  || — || October 22, 2003 || Kitt Peak || Spacewatch || GEF || align=right | 1.3 km || 
|-id=412 bgcolor=#d6d6d6
| 350412 ||  || — || May 3, 2005 || Kitt Peak || Spacewatch || — || align=right | 3.2 km || 
|-id=413 bgcolor=#d6d6d6
| 350413 ||  || — || September 19, 2001 || Socorro || LINEAR || — || align=right | 3.1 km || 
|-id=414 bgcolor=#d6d6d6
| 350414 ||  || — || January 19, 2009 || Mount Lemmon || Mount Lemmon Survey || — || align=right | 3.6 km || 
|-id=415 bgcolor=#E9E9E9
| 350415 ||  || — || April 20, 2006 || Kitt Peak || Spacewatch || — || align=right | 1.4 km || 
|-id=416 bgcolor=#E9E9E9
| 350416 ||  || — || July 8, 2003 || Palomar || NEAT || — || align=right | 1.2 km || 
|-id=417 bgcolor=#E9E9E9
| 350417 ||  || — || January 15, 2005 || Kitt Peak || Spacewatch || — || align=right | 1.8 km || 
|-id=418 bgcolor=#d6d6d6
| 350418 ||  || — || September 19, 2006 || Kitt Peak || Spacewatch || VER || align=right | 2.5 km || 
|-id=419 bgcolor=#E9E9E9
| 350419 ||  || — || October 18, 2003 || Kitt Peak || Spacewatch || — || align=right | 1.8 km || 
|-id=420 bgcolor=#fefefe
| 350420 ||  || — || November 20, 2001 || Socorro || LINEAR || — || align=right data-sort-value="0.83" | 830 m || 
|-id=421 bgcolor=#fefefe
| 350421 ||  || — || February 13, 2010 || Catalina || CSS || — || align=right data-sort-value="0.86" | 860 m || 
|-id=422 bgcolor=#d6d6d6
| 350422 ||  || — || October 11, 2001 || Kitt Peak || Spacewatch || — || align=right | 3.2 km || 
|-id=423 bgcolor=#d6d6d6
| 350423 ||  || — || June 11, 2004 || Kitt Peak || Spacewatch || — || align=right | 3.0 km || 
|-id=424 bgcolor=#E9E9E9
| 350424 ||  || — || September 12, 2007 || Anderson Mesa || LONEOS || NEM || align=right | 2.6 km || 
|-id=425 bgcolor=#d6d6d6
| 350425 ||  || — || September 26, 2006 || Catalina || CSS || — || align=right | 4.7 km || 
|-id=426 bgcolor=#E9E9E9
| 350426 ||  || — || May 20, 2006 || Kitt Peak || Spacewatch || — || align=right | 1.1 km || 
|-id=427 bgcolor=#d6d6d6
| 350427 ||  || — || November 4, 2007 || Kitt Peak || Spacewatch || — || align=right | 3.0 km || 
|-id=428 bgcolor=#E9E9E9
| 350428 ||  || — || October 24, 2003 || Kitt Peak || Spacewatch || — || align=right | 1.8 km || 
|-id=429 bgcolor=#E9E9E9
| 350429 ||  || — || November 30, 2008 || Kitt Peak || Spacewatch || — || align=right | 1.2 km || 
|-id=430 bgcolor=#E9E9E9
| 350430 ||  || — || January 26, 2001 || Kitt Peak || Spacewatch || — || align=right | 1.6 km || 
|-id=431 bgcolor=#fefefe
| 350431 ||  || — || March 13, 2007 || Mount Lemmon || Mount Lemmon Survey || NYS || align=right | 1.6 km || 
|-id=432 bgcolor=#d6d6d6
| 350432 ||  || — || September 17, 2006 || Anderson Mesa || LONEOS || LIX || align=right | 4.4 km || 
|-id=433 bgcolor=#E9E9E9
| 350433 ||  || — || March 25, 2006 || Kitt Peak || Spacewatch || — || align=right | 2.0 km || 
|-id=434 bgcolor=#E9E9E9
| 350434 ||  || — || August 19, 2002 || Palomar || NEAT || — || align=right | 2.7 km || 
|-id=435 bgcolor=#d6d6d6
| 350435 ||  || — || September 14, 2006 || Catalina || CSS || — || align=right | 3.0 km || 
|-id=436 bgcolor=#E9E9E9
| 350436 ||  || — || April 19, 2006 || Kitt Peak || Spacewatch || MAR || align=right | 1.2 km || 
|-id=437 bgcolor=#d6d6d6
| 350437 ||  || — || September 25, 2006 || Catalina || CSS || — || align=right | 3.9 km || 
|-id=438 bgcolor=#E9E9E9
| 350438 ||  || — || November 19, 2003 || Anderson Mesa || LONEOS || — || align=right | 3.6 km || 
|-id=439 bgcolor=#E9E9E9
| 350439 ||  || — || January 1, 2009 || Mount Lemmon || Mount Lemmon Survey || PAD || align=right | 1.7 km || 
|-id=440 bgcolor=#d6d6d6
| 350440 ||  || — || August 27, 2006 || Anderson Mesa || LONEOS || TEL || align=right | 1.9 km || 
|-id=441 bgcolor=#fefefe
| 350441 || 5073 T-3 || — || October 16, 1977 || Palomar || PLS || — || align=right data-sort-value="0.91" | 910 m || 
|-id=442 bgcolor=#E9E9E9
| 350442 ||  || — || June 23, 1979 || Siding Spring || E. F. Helin, S. J. Bus || — || align=right | 1.5 km || 
|-id=443 bgcolor=#fefefe
| 350443 ||  || — || October 9, 1993 || La Silla || E. W. Elst || MAS || align=right data-sort-value="0.86" | 860 m || 
|-id=444 bgcolor=#fefefe
| 350444 ||  || — || December 1, 1994 || Kitt Peak || Spacewatch || V || align=right data-sort-value="0.62" | 620 m || 
|-id=445 bgcolor=#E9E9E9
| 350445 ||  || — || February 1, 1995 || Kitt Peak || Spacewatch || — || align=right | 1.4 km || 
|-id=446 bgcolor=#fefefe
| 350446 ||  || — || March 23, 1995 || Kitt Peak || Spacewatch || — || align=right | 1.2 km || 
|-id=447 bgcolor=#d6d6d6
| 350447 ||  || — || September 29, 1995 || Kitt Peak || Spacewatch || — || align=right | 3.3 km || 
|-id=448 bgcolor=#E9E9E9
| 350448 ||  || — || October 21, 1995 || Kitt Peak || Spacewatch || — || align=right | 1.0 km || 
|-id=449 bgcolor=#E9E9E9
| 350449 ||  || — || December 18, 1995 || Kitt Peak || Spacewatch || EUN || align=right | 1.6 km || 
|-id=450 bgcolor=#d6d6d6
| 350450 ||  || — || March 11, 1996 || Kitt Peak || Spacewatch || — || align=right | 2.9 km || 
|-id=451 bgcolor=#C2FFFF
| 350451 ||  || — || September 5, 1996 || Kitt Peak || Spacewatch || L4 || align=right | 9.7 km || 
|-id=452 bgcolor=#fefefe
| 350452 ||  || — || October 11, 1996 || Kitt Peak || Spacewatch || V || align=right data-sort-value="0.91" | 910 m || 
|-id=453 bgcolor=#d6d6d6
| 350453 ||  || — || December 9, 1996 || Kitt Peak || Spacewatch || — || align=right | 3.3 km || 
|-id=454 bgcolor=#E9E9E9
| 350454 ||  || — || April 3, 1997 || Socorro || LINEAR || — || align=right | 1.0 km || 
|-id=455 bgcolor=#fefefe
| 350455 ||  || — || September 27, 1997 || Mount Hopkins || C. W. Hergenrother || V || align=right data-sort-value="0.56" | 560 m || 
|-id=456 bgcolor=#fefefe
| 350456 ||  || — || October 3, 1997 || Kitt Peak || Spacewatch || — || align=right data-sort-value="0.80" | 800 m || 
|-id=457 bgcolor=#d6d6d6
| 350457 ||  || — || October 11, 1997 || Kitt Peak || Spacewatch || KOR || align=right | 1.2 km || 
|-id=458 bgcolor=#fefefe
| 350458 ||  || — || November 23, 1997 || Kitt Peak || Spacewatch || MAS || align=right data-sort-value="0.75" | 750 m || 
|-id=459 bgcolor=#E9E9E9
| 350459 ||  || — || March 21, 1998 || Kitt Peak || Spacewatch || — || align=right | 1.5 km || 
|-id=460 bgcolor=#fefefe
| 350460 ||  || — || April 17, 1998 || Kitt Peak || Spacewatch || MAS || align=right data-sort-value="0.93" | 930 m || 
|-id=461 bgcolor=#d6d6d6
| 350461 ||  || — || April 17, 1998 || Kitt Peak || Spacewatch || — || align=right | 2.4 km || 
|-id=462 bgcolor=#FFC2E0
| 350462 ||  || — || May 22, 1998 || Kitt Peak || Spacewatch || AMO || align=right data-sort-value="0.14" | 140 m || 
|-id=463 bgcolor=#E9E9E9
| 350463 ||  || — || August 17, 1998 || Socorro || LINEAR || Tj (2.95) || align=right | 2.6 km || 
|-id=464 bgcolor=#fefefe
| 350464 ||  || — || August 17, 1998 || Socorro || LINEAR || — || align=right data-sort-value="0.96" | 960 m || 
|-id=465 bgcolor=#E9E9E9
| 350465 ||  || — || August 27, 1998 || Kitt Peak || Spacewatch || — || align=right | 1.6 km || 
|-id=466 bgcolor=#E9E9E9
| 350466 ||  || — || September 19, 1998 || Socorro || LINEAR || — || align=right | 1.6 km || 
|-id=467 bgcolor=#fefefe
| 350467 ||  || — || September 26, 1998 || Socorro || LINEAR || NYS || align=right data-sort-value="0.77" | 770 m || 
|-id=468 bgcolor=#E9E9E9
| 350468 ||  || — || October 12, 1998 || Kitt Peak || Spacewatch || NEM || align=right | 2.0 km || 
|-id=469 bgcolor=#E9E9E9
| 350469 ||  || — || October 12, 1998 || Kitt Peak || Spacewatch || — || align=right | 2.4 km || 
|-id=470 bgcolor=#E9E9E9
| 350470 ||  || — || November 19, 1998 || Kitt Peak || Spacewatch || — || align=right | 3.9 km || 
|-id=471 bgcolor=#fefefe
| 350471 ||  || — || November 21, 1998 || Kitt Peak || Spacewatch || FLO || align=right data-sort-value="0.78" | 780 m || 
|-id=472 bgcolor=#fefefe
| 350472 ||  || — || December 19, 1998 || Kitt Peak || Spacewatch || — || align=right data-sort-value="0.73" | 730 m || 
|-id=473 bgcolor=#fefefe
| 350473 ||  || — || February 17, 1999 || Socorro || LINEAR || H || align=right | 1.1 km || 
|-id=474 bgcolor=#d6d6d6
| 350474 ||  || — || March 10, 1999 || Kitt Peak || Spacewatch || — || align=right | 2.4 km || 
|-id=475 bgcolor=#E9E9E9
| 350475 ||  || — || September 7, 1999 || Socorro || LINEAR || — || align=right | 1.6 km || 
|-id=476 bgcolor=#E9E9E9
| 350476 ||  || — || September 7, 1999 || Socorro || LINEAR || — || align=right data-sort-value="0.99" | 990 m || 
|-id=477 bgcolor=#E9E9E9
| 350477 ||  || — || September 9, 1999 || Socorro || LINEAR || — || align=right data-sort-value="0.99" | 990 m || 
|-id=478 bgcolor=#E9E9E9
| 350478 ||  || — || September 8, 1999 || Socorro || LINEAR || — || align=right | 1.1 km || 
|-id=479 bgcolor=#fefefe
| 350479 ||  || — || September 14, 1999 || Catalina || CSS || — || align=right data-sort-value="0.85" | 850 m || 
|-id=480 bgcolor=#E9E9E9
| 350480 ||  || — || September 16, 1999 || Prescott || P. G. Comba || — || align=right | 1.0 km || 
|-id=481 bgcolor=#E9E9E9
| 350481 ||  || — || September 5, 1999 || Anderson Mesa || LONEOS || — || align=right | 2.2 km || 
|-id=482 bgcolor=#E9E9E9
| 350482 ||  || — || September 30, 1999 || Catalina || CSS || — || align=right | 1.0 km || 
|-id=483 bgcolor=#E9E9E9
| 350483 ||  || — || October 9, 1999 || Kitt Peak || Spacewatch || EUN || align=right | 1.4 km || 
|-id=484 bgcolor=#E9E9E9
| 350484 ||  || — || October 4, 1999 || Socorro || LINEAR || JUN || align=right | 1.1 km || 
|-id=485 bgcolor=#E9E9E9
| 350485 ||  || — || October 4, 1999 || Socorro || LINEAR || — || align=right | 1.1 km || 
|-id=486 bgcolor=#E9E9E9
| 350486 ||  || — || October 4, 1999 || Socorro || LINEAR || — || align=right | 1.5 km || 
|-id=487 bgcolor=#E9E9E9
| 350487 ||  || — || October 6, 1999 || Socorro || LINEAR || — || align=right | 2.5 km || 
|-id=488 bgcolor=#E9E9E9
| 350488 ||  || — || October 7, 1999 || Socorro || LINEAR || — || align=right | 1.8 km || 
|-id=489 bgcolor=#E9E9E9
| 350489 ||  || — || October 29, 1999 || Kitt Peak || Spacewatch || — || align=right | 2.4 km || 
|-id=490 bgcolor=#E9E9E9
| 350490 ||  || — || October 31, 1999 || Kitt Peak || Spacewatch || — || align=right | 1.1 km || 
|-id=491 bgcolor=#E9E9E9
| 350491 ||  || — || November 9, 1999 || Baton Rouge || W. R. Cooney Jr. || — || align=right | 1.2 km || 
|-id=492 bgcolor=#E9E9E9
| 350492 ||  || — || November 10, 1999 || Socorro || LINEAR || — || align=right | 1.7 km || 
|-id=493 bgcolor=#E9E9E9
| 350493 ||  || — || November 2, 1999 || Kitt Peak || Spacewatch || BRG || align=right | 1.5 km || 
|-id=494 bgcolor=#E9E9E9
| 350494 ||  || — || November 5, 1999 || Kitt Peak || Spacewatch || — || align=right | 1.0 km || 
|-id=495 bgcolor=#fefefe
| 350495 ||  || — || November 9, 1999 || Socorro || LINEAR || — || align=right data-sort-value="0.80" | 800 m || 
|-id=496 bgcolor=#E9E9E9
| 350496 ||  || — || November 10, 1999 || Kitt Peak || Spacewatch || — || align=right | 1.2 km || 
|-id=497 bgcolor=#E9E9E9
| 350497 ||  || — || November 13, 1999 || Catalina || CSS || — || align=right | 1.0 km || 
|-id=498 bgcolor=#E9E9E9
| 350498 ||  || — || November 11, 1999 || Kitt Peak || Spacewatch || — || align=right | 2.0 km || 
|-id=499 bgcolor=#E9E9E9
| 350499 ||  || — || November 2, 1999 || Catalina || CSS || — || align=right | 1.3 km || 
|-id=500 bgcolor=#E9E9E9
| 350500 ||  || — || November 11, 1999 || Kitt Peak || Spacewatch || — || align=right data-sort-value="0.97" | 970 m || 
|}

350501–350600 

|-bgcolor=#E9E9E9
| 350501 ||  || — || November 13, 1999 || Catalina || CSS || — || align=right | 1.0 km || 
|-id=502 bgcolor=#E9E9E9
| 350502 ||  || — || November 30, 1999 || Kitt Peak || Spacewatch || JUN || align=right data-sort-value="0.99" | 990 m || 
|-id=503 bgcolor=#E9E9E9
| 350503 ||  || — || December 5, 1999 || Socorro || LINEAR || BAR || align=right | 1.8 km || 
|-id=504 bgcolor=#E9E9E9
| 350504 ||  || — || December 7, 1999 || Socorro || LINEAR || MIT || align=right | 3.8 km || 
|-id=505 bgcolor=#E9E9E9
| 350505 ||  || — || December 7, 1999 || Socorro || LINEAR || JUN || align=right | 1.1 km || 
|-id=506 bgcolor=#E9E9E9
| 350506 ||  || — || December 12, 1999 || Socorro || LINEAR || — || align=right | 2.0 km || 
|-id=507 bgcolor=#E9E9E9
| 350507 ||  || — || December 13, 1999 || Kitt Peak || Spacewatch || ADE || align=right | 2.0 km || 
|-id=508 bgcolor=#fefefe
| 350508 ||  || — || December 14, 1999 || Kitt Peak || Spacewatch || — || align=right data-sort-value="0.92" | 920 m || 
|-id=509 bgcolor=#fefefe
| 350509 Vepřoknedlozelo ||  ||  || January 14, 2000 || Kleť || M. Tichý || — || align=right data-sort-value="0.99" | 990 m || 
|-id=510 bgcolor=#E9E9E9
| 350510 ||  || — || January 6, 2000 || Kitt Peak || Spacewatch || — || align=right | 1.1 km || 
|-id=511 bgcolor=#E9E9E9
| 350511 ||  || — || January 3, 2000 || Kitt Peak || Spacewatch || — || align=right | 2.2 km || 
|-id=512 bgcolor=#fefefe
| 350512 ||  || — || January 2, 2000 || Socorro || LINEAR || H || align=right data-sort-value="0.96" | 960 m || 
|-id=513 bgcolor=#FFC2E0
| 350513 ||  || — || January 28, 2000 || Kitt Peak || Spacewatch || AMO +1kmcritical || align=right | 1.8 km || 
|-id=514 bgcolor=#E9E9E9
| 350514 ||  || — || January 30, 2000 || Kitt Peak || Spacewatch || — || align=right | 1.4 km || 
|-id=515 bgcolor=#E9E9E9
| 350515 ||  || — || January 30, 2000 || Kitt Peak || Spacewatch || MIS || align=right | 2.3 km || 
|-id=516 bgcolor=#E9E9E9
| 350516 ||  || — || January 29, 2000 || Kitt Peak || Spacewatch || — || align=right | 1.4 km || 
|-id=517 bgcolor=#E9E9E9
| 350517 ||  || — || February 3, 2000 || Socorro || LINEAR || — || align=right | 2.2 km || 
|-id=518 bgcolor=#FA8072
| 350518 ||  || — || February 4, 2000 || Siding Spring || R. H. McNaught || — || align=right | 1.4 km || 
|-id=519 bgcolor=#E9E9E9
| 350519 ||  || — || February 5, 2000 || Kitt Peak || M. W. Buie || HEN || align=right | 1.0 km || 
|-id=520 bgcolor=#fefefe
| 350520 ||  || — || February 6, 2000 || Kitt Peak || Spacewatch || — || align=right data-sort-value="0.81" | 810 m || 
|-id=521 bgcolor=#E9E9E9
| 350521 ||  || — || February 29, 2000 || Socorro || LINEAR || — || align=right | 3.6 km || 
|-id=522 bgcolor=#E9E9E9
| 350522 ||  || — || February 25, 2000 || Kitt Peak || Spacewatch || GAL || align=right | 1.5 km || 
|-id=523 bgcolor=#FFC2E0
| 350523 ||  || — || March 3, 2000 || Catalina || CSS || APOPHA || align=right data-sort-value="0.21" | 210 m || 
|-id=524 bgcolor=#FA8072
| 350524 ||  || — || March 12, 2000 || Socorro || LINEAR || — || align=right | 1.4 km || 
|-id=525 bgcolor=#fefefe
| 350525 ||  || — || March 27, 2000 || Socorro || LINEAR || H || align=right | 1.1 km || 
|-id=526 bgcolor=#fefefe
| 350526 ||  || — || March 29, 2000 || Kitt Peak || Spacewatch || FLO || align=right data-sort-value="0.92" | 920 m || 
|-id=527 bgcolor=#E9E9E9
| 350527 ||  || — || March 29, 2000 || Socorro || LINEAR || PAL || align=right | 2.2 km || 
|-id=528 bgcolor=#E9E9E9
| 350528 ||  || — || March 30, 2000 || Kitt Peak || Spacewatch || — || align=right | 2.8 km || 
|-id=529 bgcolor=#E9E9E9
| 350529 ||  || — || April 4, 2000 || Socorro || LINEAR || DOR || align=right | 3.6 km || 
|-id=530 bgcolor=#E9E9E9
| 350530 ||  || — || May 4, 2000 || Socorro || LINEAR || — || align=right | 2.0 km || 
|-id=531 bgcolor=#E9E9E9
| 350531 ||  || — || May 23, 2000 || Prescott || P. G. Comba || WAT || align=right | 2.4 km || 
|-id=532 bgcolor=#fefefe
| 350532 ||  || — || May 29, 2000 || Kitt Peak || Spacewatch || FLO || align=right data-sort-value="0.73" | 730 m || 
|-id=533 bgcolor=#E9E9E9
| 350533 ||  || — || June 4, 2000 || Haleakala || NEAT || — || align=right | 2.3 km || 
|-id=534 bgcolor=#fefefe
| 350534 ||  || — || August 24, 2000 || Socorro || LINEAR || ERI || align=right | 2.1 km || 
|-id=535 bgcolor=#FA8072
| 350535 ||  || — || August 24, 2000 || Socorro || LINEAR || — || align=right | 1.1 km || 
|-id=536 bgcolor=#FFC2E0
| 350536 ||  || — || August 29, 2000 || Socorro || LINEAR || AMO || align=right data-sort-value="0.40" | 400 m || 
|-id=537 bgcolor=#d6d6d6
| 350537 ||  || — || September 7, 2000 || Kitt Peak || Spacewatch || — || align=right | 3.1 km || 
|-id=538 bgcolor=#fefefe
| 350538 ||  || — || September 1, 2000 || Socorro || LINEAR || — || align=right data-sort-value="0.90" | 900 m || 
|-id=539 bgcolor=#d6d6d6
| 350539 ||  || — || September 3, 2000 || Socorro || LINEAR || — || align=right | 4.8 km || 
|-id=540 bgcolor=#fefefe
| 350540 ||  || — || September 24, 2000 || Socorro || LINEAR || NYS || align=right data-sort-value="0.76" | 760 m || 
|-id=541 bgcolor=#fefefe
| 350541 ||  || — || September 23, 2000 || Socorro || LINEAR || H || align=right | 1.2 km || 
|-id=542 bgcolor=#fefefe
| 350542 ||  || — || September 22, 2000 || Collins Obs. || A. J. Cecce || — || align=right | 1.3 km || 
|-id=543 bgcolor=#fefefe
| 350543 ||  || — || September 23, 2000 || Socorro || LINEAR || — || align=right | 1.0 km || 
|-id=544 bgcolor=#fefefe
| 350544 ||  || — || September 22, 2000 || Kitt Peak || Spacewatch || — || align=right data-sort-value="0.98" | 980 m || 
|-id=545 bgcolor=#d6d6d6
| 350545 ||  || — || September 3, 2000 || Socorro || LINEAR || THB || align=right | 2.7 km || 
|-id=546 bgcolor=#d6d6d6
| 350546 ||  || — || September 20, 2000 || Kitt Peak || Spacewatch || THM || align=right | 3.1 km || 
|-id=547 bgcolor=#fefefe
| 350547 ||  || — || September 22, 2000 || Kitt Peak || Spacewatch || — || align=right | 1.4 km || 
|-id=548 bgcolor=#fefefe
| 350548 ||  || — || September 24, 2000 || Socorro || LINEAR || MAS || align=right | 1.0 km || 
|-id=549 bgcolor=#fefefe
| 350549 ||  || — || September 24, 2000 || Socorro || LINEAR || V || align=right data-sort-value="0.75" | 750 m || 
|-id=550 bgcolor=#fefefe
| 350550 ||  || — || September 27, 2000 || Socorro || LINEAR || MAS || align=right data-sort-value="0.96" | 960 m || 
|-id=551 bgcolor=#fefefe
| 350551 ||  || — || September 23, 2000 || Socorro || LINEAR || — || align=right | 1.1 km || 
|-id=552 bgcolor=#d6d6d6
| 350552 ||  || — || September 26, 2000 || Socorro || LINEAR || TIR || align=right | 3.5 km || 
|-id=553 bgcolor=#fefefe
| 350553 ||  || — || September 30, 2000 || Kitt Peak || Spacewatch || NYS || align=right data-sort-value="0.85" | 850 m || 
|-id=554 bgcolor=#fefefe
| 350554 ||  || — || August 28, 2000 || Socorro || LINEAR || V || align=right | 1.1 km || 
|-id=555 bgcolor=#fefefe
| 350555 ||  || — || October 1, 2000 || Socorro || LINEAR || — || align=right data-sort-value="0.89" | 890 m || 
|-id=556 bgcolor=#d6d6d6
| 350556 ||  || — || October 3, 2000 || Socorro || LINEAR || — || align=right | 4.9 km || 
|-id=557 bgcolor=#fefefe
| 350557 ||  || — || October 2, 2000 || Anderson Mesa || LONEOS || KLI || align=right | 3.4 km || 
|-id=558 bgcolor=#fefefe
| 350558 ||  || — || October 24, 2000 || Socorro || LINEAR || — || align=right | 1.2 km || 
|-id=559 bgcolor=#E9E9E9
| 350559 ||  || — || October 31, 2000 || Socorro || LINEAR || — || align=right | 1.8 km || 
|-id=560 bgcolor=#fefefe
| 350560 ||  || — || October 24, 2000 || Socorro || LINEAR || — || align=right | 1.2 km || 
|-id=561 bgcolor=#E9E9E9
| 350561 ||  || — || October 25, 2000 || Socorro || LINEAR || — || align=right | 1.2 km || 
|-id=562 bgcolor=#fefefe
| 350562 ||  || — || October 2, 2000 || Socorro || LINEAR || — || align=right | 1.2 km || 
|-id=563 bgcolor=#E9E9E9
| 350563 ||  || — || October 31, 2000 || Socorro || LINEAR || — || align=right | 1.5 km || 
|-id=564 bgcolor=#fefefe
| 350564 ||  || — || October 25, 2000 || Socorro || LINEAR || — || align=right | 1.1 km || 
|-id=565 bgcolor=#d6d6d6
| 350565 ||  || — || October 30, 2000 || Socorro || LINEAR || — || align=right | 3.3 km || 
|-id=566 bgcolor=#fefefe
| 350566 ||  || — || November 30, 2000 || Anderson Mesa || LONEOS || — || align=right | 1.4 km || 
|-id=567 bgcolor=#fefefe
| 350567 ||  || — || November 18, 2000 || Anderson Mesa || LONEOS || — || align=right | 1.3 km || 
|-id=568 bgcolor=#E9E9E9
| 350568 ||  || — || December 1, 2000 || Socorro || LINEAR || KRM || align=right | 3.2 km || 
|-id=569 bgcolor=#fefefe
| 350569 ||  || — || December 18, 2000 || Kitt Peak || Spacewatch || — || align=right | 1.5 km || 
|-id=570 bgcolor=#E9E9E9
| 350570 ||  || — || December 30, 2000 || Socorro || LINEAR || — || align=right | 1.3 km || 
|-id=571 bgcolor=#E9E9E9
| 350571 ||  || — || December 30, 2000 || Socorro || LINEAR || — || align=right | 1.8 km || 
|-id=572 bgcolor=#E9E9E9
| 350572 ||  || — || December 30, 2000 || Socorro || LINEAR || — || align=right | 1.7 km || 
|-id=573 bgcolor=#d6d6d6
| 350573 ||  || — || January 26, 2001 || Socorro || LINEAR || EUP || align=right | 7.5 km || 
|-id=574 bgcolor=#C2FFFF
| 350574 ||  || — || January 18, 2001 || Haleakala || NEAT || L4 || align=right | 13 km || 
|-id=575 bgcolor=#E9E9E9
| 350575 ||  || — || January 26, 2001 || Kitt Peak || Spacewatch || — || align=right | 1.4 km || 
|-id=576 bgcolor=#E9E9E9
| 350576 ||  || — || March 15, 2001 || Kitt Peak || Spacewatch || — || align=right | 1.4 km || 
|-id=577 bgcolor=#E9E9E9
| 350577 ||  || — || March 26, 2001 || Kitt Peak || Spacewatch || — || align=right | 2.0 km || 
|-id=578 bgcolor=#fefefe
| 350578 ||  || — || April 28, 2001 || Kitt Peak || Spacewatch || — || align=right data-sort-value="0.95" | 950 m || 
|-id=579 bgcolor=#E9E9E9
| 350579 ||  || — || May 21, 2001 || Anderson Mesa || LONEOS || — || align=right | 1.4 km || 
|-id=580 bgcolor=#E9E9E9
| 350580 ||  || — || June 19, 2001 || Palomar || NEAT || — || align=right | 3.0 km || 
|-id=581 bgcolor=#fefefe
| 350581 ||  || — || July 22, 2001 || Palomar || NEAT || — || align=right | 1.2 km || 
|-id=582 bgcolor=#fefefe
| 350582 ||  || — || July 29, 2001 || Palomar || NEAT || H || align=right data-sort-value="0.77" | 770 m || 
|-id=583 bgcolor=#fefefe
| 350583 ||  || — || August 9, 2001 || Palomar || NEAT || V || align=right data-sort-value="0.82" | 820 m || 
|-id=584 bgcolor=#fefefe
| 350584 ||  || — || August 9, 2001 || Palomar || NEAT || — || align=right data-sort-value="0.87" | 870 m || 
|-id=585 bgcolor=#fefefe
| 350585 ||  || — || August 9, 2001 || Palomar || NEAT || — || align=right data-sort-value="0.91" | 910 m || 
|-id=586 bgcolor=#fefefe
| 350586 ||  || — || August 12, 2001 || Palomar || NEAT || H || align=right | 1.0 km || 
|-id=587 bgcolor=#FA8072
| 350587 ||  || — || August 16, 2001 || Socorro || LINEAR || — || align=right | 1.1 km || 
|-id=588 bgcolor=#fefefe
| 350588 ||  || — || August 16, 2001 || Socorro || LINEAR || PHO || align=right | 1.4 km || 
|-id=589 bgcolor=#d6d6d6
| 350589 ||  || — || August 16, 2001 || Socorro || LINEAR || — || align=right | 4.4 km || 
|-id=590 bgcolor=#d6d6d6
| 350590 ||  || — || August 17, 2001 || Socorro || LINEAR || — || align=right | 3.5 km || 
|-id=591 bgcolor=#fefefe
| 350591 ||  || — || August 19, 2001 || Socorro || LINEAR || H || align=right data-sort-value="0.81" | 810 m || 
|-id=592 bgcolor=#d6d6d6
| 350592 ||  || — || August 21, 2001 || Kitt Peak || Spacewatch || — || align=right | 2.7 km || 
|-id=593 bgcolor=#fefefe
| 350593 ||  || — || August 22, 2001 || Palomar || NEAT || H || align=right | 1.1 km || 
|-id=594 bgcolor=#FA8072
| 350594 ||  || — || August 25, 2001 || Socorro || LINEAR || — || align=right data-sort-value="0.75" | 750 m || 
|-id=595 bgcolor=#fefefe
| 350595 ||  || — || August 19, 2001 || Socorro || LINEAR || V || align=right data-sort-value="0.70" | 700 m || 
|-id=596 bgcolor=#fefefe
| 350596 ||  || — || August 16, 2001 || Socorro || LINEAR || FLO || align=right data-sort-value="0.63" | 630 m || 
|-id=597 bgcolor=#fefefe
| 350597 ||  || — || August 24, 2001 || Socorro || LINEAR || — || align=right | 1.4 km || 
|-id=598 bgcolor=#fefefe
| 350598 ||  || — || September 7, 2001 || Socorro || LINEAR || FLO || align=right data-sort-value="0.71" | 710 m || 
|-id=599 bgcolor=#fefefe
| 350599 ||  || — || September 6, 2001 || Palomar || NEAT || FLO || align=right | 1.1 km || 
|-id=600 bgcolor=#fefefe
| 350600 ||  || — || September 12, 2001 || Socorro || LINEAR || — || align=right data-sort-value="0.66" | 660 m || 
|}

350601–350700 

|-bgcolor=#fefefe
| 350601 ||  || — || September 12, 2001 || Socorro || LINEAR || — || align=right | 1.1 km || 
|-id=602 bgcolor=#fefefe
| 350602 ||  || — || September 12, 2001 || Socorro || LINEAR || — || align=right data-sort-value="0.76" | 760 m || 
|-id=603 bgcolor=#d6d6d6
| 350603 ||  || — || September 12, 2001 || Socorro || LINEAR || — || align=right | 3.0 km || 
|-id=604 bgcolor=#fefefe
| 350604 ||  || — || September 12, 2001 || Socorro || LINEAR || — || align=right data-sort-value="0.87" | 870 m || 
|-id=605 bgcolor=#fefefe
| 350605 ||  || — || September 12, 2001 || Socorro || LINEAR || V || align=right data-sort-value="0.66" | 660 m || 
|-id=606 bgcolor=#fefefe
| 350606 ||  || — || September 16, 2001 || Socorro || LINEAR || — || align=right data-sort-value="0.87" | 870 m || 
|-id=607 bgcolor=#fefefe
| 350607 ||  || — || September 16, 2001 || Socorro || LINEAR || V || align=right data-sort-value="0.78" | 780 m || 
|-id=608 bgcolor=#d6d6d6
| 350608 ||  || — || September 16, 2001 || Socorro || LINEAR || — || align=right | 2.9 km || 
|-id=609 bgcolor=#fefefe
| 350609 ||  || — || September 16, 2001 || Socorro || LINEAR || FLO || align=right data-sort-value="0.72" | 720 m || 
|-id=610 bgcolor=#fefefe
| 350610 ||  || — || September 17, 2001 || Socorro || LINEAR || MAS || align=right data-sort-value="0.98" | 980 m || 
|-id=611 bgcolor=#fefefe
| 350611 ||  || — || September 16, 2001 || Socorro || LINEAR || FLO || align=right data-sort-value="0.60" | 600 m || 
|-id=612 bgcolor=#fefefe
| 350612 ||  || — || September 20, 2001 || Socorro || LINEAR || — || align=right | 1.00 km || 
|-id=613 bgcolor=#fefefe
| 350613 ||  || — || September 20, 2001 || Socorro || LINEAR || — || align=right data-sort-value="0.87" | 870 m || 
|-id=614 bgcolor=#fefefe
| 350614 ||  || — || September 20, 2001 || Desert Eagle || W. K. Y. Yeung || — || align=right data-sort-value="0.86" | 860 m || 
|-id=615 bgcolor=#fefefe
| 350615 ||  || — || September 16, 2001 || Socorro || LINEAR || — || align=right data-sort-value="0.59" | 590 m || 
|-id=616 bgcolor=#fefefe
| 350616 ||  || — || September 16, 2001 || Socorro || LINEAR || H || align=right data-sort-value="0.93" | 930 m || 
|-id=617 bgcolor=#fefefe
| 350617 ||  || — || September 16, 2001 || Socorro || LINEAR || FLO || align=right data-sort-value="0.64" | 640 m || 
|-id=618 bgcolor=#fefefe
| 350618 ||  || — || September 19, 2001 || Socorro || LINEAR || — || align=right data-sort-value="0.79" | 790 m || 
|-id=619 bgcolor=#fefefe
| 350619 ||  || — || September 19, 2001 || Socorro || LINEAR || — || align=right data-sort-value="0.98" | 980 m || 
|-id=620 bgcolor=#d6d6d6
| 350620 ||  || — || September 19, 2001 || Socorro || LINEAR || — || align=right | 2.7 km || 
|-id=621 bgcolor=#fefefe
| 350621 ||  || — || September 19, 2001 || Socorro || LINEAR || FLO || align=right data-sort-value="0.72" | 720 m || 
|-id=622 bgcolor=#d6d6d6
| 350622 ||  || — || September 19, 2001 || Socorro || LINEAR || — || align=right | 2.6 km || 
|-id=623 bgcolor=#fefefe
| 350623 ||  || — || September 19, 2001 || Socorro || LINEAR || — || align=right data-sort-value="0.80" | 800 m || 
|-id=624 bgcolor=#fefefe
| 350624 ||  || — || September 19, 2001 || Socorro || LINEAR || FLO || align=right data-sort-value="0.82" | 820 m || 
|-id=625 bgcolor=#fefefe
| 350625 ||  || — || September 19, 2001 || Socorro || LINEAR || — || align=right data-sort-value="0.83" | 830 m || 
|-id=626 bgcolor=#d6d6d6
| 350626 ||  || — || September 19, 2001 || Socorro || LINEAR || EOS || align=right | 2.1 km || 
|-id=627 bgcolor=#d6d6d6
| 350627 ||  || — || September 19, 2001 || Socorro || LINEAR || — || align=right | 4.0 km || 
|-id=628 bgcolor=#fefefe
| 350628 ||  || — || September 24, 2001 || Socorro || LINEAR || H || align=right data-sort-value="0.97" | 970 m || 
|-id=629 bgcolor=#fefefe
| 350629 ||  || — || September 19, 2001 || Socorro || LINEAR || NYS || align=right data-sort-value="0.63" | 630 m || 
|-id=630 bgcolor=#fefefe
| 350630 ||  || — || September 21, 2001 || Socorro || LINEAR || FLO || align=right data-sort-value="0.75" | 750 m || 
|-id=631 bgcolor=#fefefe
| 350631 ||  || — || October 7, 2001 || Palomar || NEAT || H || align=right data-sort-value="0.92" | 920 m || 
|-id=632 bgcolor=#fefefe
| 350632 ||  || — || October 8, 2001 || Palomar || NEAT || — || align=right data-sort-value="0.78" | 780 m || 
|-id=633 bgcolor=#fefefe
| 350633 ||  || — || October 13, 2001 || Socorro || LINEAR || H || align=right data-sort-value="0.80" | 800 m || 
|-id=634 bgcolor=#d6d6d6
| 350634 ||  || — || October 13, 2001 || Socorro || LINEAR || — || align=right | 3.0 km || 
|-id=635 bgcolor=#fefefe
| 350635 ||  || — || October 13, 2001 || Socorro || LINEAR || — || align=right data-sort-value="0.90" | 900 m || 
|-id=636 bgcolor=#fefefe
| 350636 ||  || — || October 13, 2001 || Socorro || LINEAR || — || align=right data-sort-value="0.92" | 920 m || 
|-id=637 bgcolor=#fefefe
| 350637 ||  || — || October 13, 2001 || Socorro || LINEAR || ERI || align=right | 2.5 km || 
|-id=638 bgcolor=#fefefe
| 350638 ||  || — || October 14, 2001 || Socorro || LINEAR || NYS || align=right data-sort-value="0.72" | 720 m || 
|-id=639 bgcolor=#fefefe
| 350639 ||  || — || October 15, 2001 || Socorro || LINEAR || — || align=right data-sort-value="0.84" | 840 m || 
|-id=640 bgcolor=#fefefe
| 350640 ||  || — || October 15, 2001 || Socorro || LINEAR || — || align=right data-sort-value="0.93" | 930 m || 
|-id=641 bgcolor=#fefefe
| 350641 ||  || — || October 15, 2001 || Socorro || LINEAR || — || align=right data-sort-value="0.94" | 940 m || 
|-id=642 bgcolor=#fefefe
| 350642 ||  || — || October 14, 2001 || Socorro || LINEAR || V || align=right | 1.1 km || 
|-id=643 bgcolor=#fefefe
| 350643 ||  || — || October 12, 2001 || Haleakala || NEAT || — || align=right | 1.1 km || 
|-id=644 bgcolor=#d6d6d6
| 350644 ||  || — || October 14, 2001 || Kitt Peak || Spacewatch || — || align=right | 2.5 km || 
|-id=645 bgcolor=#fefefe
| 350645 ||  || — || October 13, 2001 || Palomar || NEAT || V || align=right data-sort-value="0.85" | 850 m || 
|-id=646 bgcolor=#fefefe
| 350646 ||  || — || October 13, 2001 || Palomar || NEAT || — || align=right | 1.2 km || 
|-id=647 bgcolor=#d6d6d6
| 350647 ||  || — || October 10, 2001 || Palomar || NEAT || — || align=right | 4.2 km || 
|-id=648 bgcolor=#fefefe
| 350648 ||  || — || October 10, 2001 || Palomar || NEAT || NYS || align=right data-sort-value="0.82" | 820 m || 
|-id=649 bgcolor=#fefefe
| 350649 ||  || — || October 11, 2001 || Socorro || LINEAR || V || align=right data-sort-value="0.78" | 780 m || 
|-id=650 bgcolor=#d6d6d6
| 350650 ||  || — || October 11, 2001 || Palomar || NEAT || — || align=right | 3.0 km || 
|-id=651 bgcolor=#fefefe
| 350651 ||  || — || October 13, 2001 || Socorro || LINEAR || — || align=right | 1.0 km || 
|-id=652 bgcolor=#fefefe
| 350652 ||  || — || October 13, 2001 || Palomar || NEAT || — || align=right data-sort-value="0.73" | 730 m || 
|-id=653 bgcolor=#fefefe
| 350653 ||  || — || October 13, 2001 || Palomar || NEAT || FLO || align=right data-sort-value="0.96" | 960 m || 
|-id=654 bgcolor=#d6d6d6
| 350654 ||  || — || October 14, 2001 || Socorro || LINEAR || — || align=right | 3.4 km || 
|-id=655 bgcolor=#d6d6d6
| 350655 ||  || — || October 15, 2001 || Palomar || NEAT || EOS || align=right | 2.2 km || 
|-id=656 bgcolor=#fefefe
| 350656 ||  || — || October 10, 2001 || Palomar || NEAT || — || align=right data-sort-value="0.89" | 890 m || 
|-id=657 bgcolor=#d6d6d6
| 350657 ||  || — || October 13, 2001 || Kitt Peak || Spacewatch || — || align=right | 2.2 km || 
|-id=658 bgcolor=#fefefe
| 350658 ||  || — || October 14, 2001 || Anderson Mesa || LONEOS || FLO || align=right data-sort-value="0.74" | 740 m || 
|-id=659 bgcolor=#d6d6d6
| 350659 ||  || — || October 14, 2001 || Apache Point || SDSS || — || align=right | 3.0 km || 
|-id=660 bgcolor=#fefefe
| 350660 ||  || — || December 4, 2005 || Kitt Peak || Spacewatch || FLO || align=right data-sort-value="0.64" | 640 m || 
|-id=661 bgcolor=#fefefe
| 350661 ||  || — || October 17, 2001 || Socorro || LINEAR || — || align=right data-sort-value="0.78" | 780 m || 
|-id=662 bgcolor=#fefefe
| 350662 ||  || — || October 23, 2001 || Desert Eagle || W. K. Y. Yeung || — || align=right | 1.2 km || 
|-id=663 bgcolor=#fefefe
| 350663 ||  || — || October 17, 2001 || Socorro || LINEAR || — || align=right | 1.1 km || 
|-id=664 bgcolor=#fefefe
| 350664 ||  || — || October 16, 2001 || Socorro || LINEAR || — || align=right | 1.0 km || 
|-id=665 bgcolor=#d6d6d6
| 350665 ||  || — || October 17, 2001 || Socorro || LINEAR || — || align=right | 2.8 km || 
|-id=666 bgcolor=#fefefe
| 350666 ||  || — || October 17, 2001 || Socorro || LINEAR || NYS || align=right data-sort-value="0.69" | 690 m || 
|-id=667 bgcolor=#fefefe
| 350667 ||  || — || October 17, 2001 || Socorro || LINEAR || NYS || align=right data-sort-value="0.83" | 830 m || 
|-id=668 bgcolor=#fefefe
| 350668 ||  || — || October 17, 2001 || Socorro || LINEAR || — || align=right data-sort-value="0.67" | 670 m || 
|-id=669 bgcolor=#fefefe
| 350669 ||  || — || October 17, 2001 || Kitt Peak || Spacewatch || — || align=right | 1.0 km || 
|-id=670 bgcolor=#fefefe
| 350670 ||  || — || October 17, 2001 || Socorro || LINEAR || — || align=right data-sort-value="0.83" | 830 m || 
|-id=671 bgcolor=#fefefe
| 350671 ||  || — || October 20, 2001 || Socorro || LINEAR || — || align=right | 1.2 km || 
|-id=672 bgcolor=#d6d6d6
| 350672 ||  || — || October 18, 2001 || Palomar || NEAT || NAE || align=right | 2.8 km || 
|-id=673 bgcolor=#fefefe
| 350673 ||  || — || October 18, 2001 || Palomar || NEAT || — || align=right | 1.2 km || 
|-id=674 bgcolor=#d6d6d6
| 350674 ||  || — || October 17, 2001 || Socorro || LINEAR || — || align=right | 3.2 km || 
|-id=675 bgcolor=#fefefe
| 350675 ||  || — || October 20, 2001 || Socorro || LINEAR || — || align=right data-sort-value="0.72" | 720 m || 
|-id=676 bgcolor=#d6d6d6
| 350676 ||  || — || October 22, 2001 || Socorro || LINEAR || — || align=right | 3.5 km || 
|-id=677 bgcolor=#fefefe
| 350677 ||  || — || October 23, 2001 || Socorro || LINEAR || NYS || align=right data-sort-value="0.79" | 790 m || 
|-id=678 bgcolor=#fefefe
| 350678 ||  || — || October 23, 2001 || Socorro || LINEAR || NYS || align=right data-sort-value="0.82" | 820 m || 
|-id=679 bgcolor=#fefefe
| 350679 ||  || — || October 23, 2001 || Socorro || LINEAR || — || align=right data-sort-value="0.86" | 860 m || 
|-id=680 bgcolor=#d6d6d6
| 350680 ||  || — || October 23, 2001 || Socorro || LINEAR || — || align=right | 3.0 km || 
|-id=681 bgcolor=#d6d6d6
| 350681 ||  || — || October 18, 2001 || Palomar || NEAT || — || align=right | 2.3 km || 
|-id=682 bgcolor=#d6d6d6
| 350682 ||  || — || October 25, 2001 || Kitt Peak || Spacewatch || KOR || align=right | 1.5 km || 
|-id=683 bgcolor=#fefefe
| 350683 ||  || — || October 16, 2001 || Palomar || NEAT || NYS || align=right data-sort-value="0.61" | 610 m || 
|-id=684 bgcolor=#d6d6d6
| 350684 ||  || — || October 18, 2001 || Socorro || LINEAR || EOS || align=right | 2.6 km || 
|-id=685 bgcolor=#d6d6d6
| 350685 ||  || — || October 2, 2006 || Catalina || CSS || — || align=right | 4.0 km || 
|-id=686 bgcolor=#FA8072
| 350686 ||  || — || November 11, 2001 || Socorro || LINEAR || H || align=right | 1.0 km || 
|-id=687 bgcolor=#fefefe
| 350687 ||  || — || November 10, 2001 || Socorro || LINEAR || PHO || align=right | 1.4 km || 
|-id=688 bgcolor=#fefefe
| 350688 ||  || — || November 9, 2001 || Socorro || LINEAR || NYS || align=right data-sort-value="0.88" | 880 m || 
|-id=689 bgcolor=#fefefe
| 350689 ||  || — || November 9, 2001 || Socorro || LINEAR || — || align=right data-sort-value="0.86" | 860 m || 
|-id=690 bgcolor=#fefefe
| 350690 ||  || — || November 10, 2001 || Socorro || LINEAR || FLO || align=right data-sort-value="0.67" | 670 m || 
|-id=691 bgcolor=#fefefe
| 350691 ||  || — || November 10, 2001 || Socorro || LINEAR || NYS || align=right data-sort-value="0.66" | 660 m || 
|-id=692 bgcolor=#d6d6d6
| 350692 ||  || — || November 12, 2001 || Socorro || LINEAR || — || align=right | 3.7 km || 
|-id=693 bgcolor=#fefefe
| 350693 ||  || — || November 12, 2001 || Socorro || LINEAR || — || align=right | 1.1 km || 
|-id=694 bgcolor=#fefefe
| 350694 ||  || — || November 12, 2001 || Socorro || LINEAR || NYS || align=right data-sort-value="0.63" | 630 m || 
|-id=695 bgcolor=#fefefe
| 350695 ||  || — || November 15, 2001 || Kitt Peak || Spacewatch || V || align=right data-sort-value="0.68" | 680 m || 
|-id=696 bgcolor=#fefefe
| 350696 ||  || — || November 17, 2001 || Socorro || LINEAR || ERI || align=right | 1.7 km || 
|-id=697 bgcolor=#fefefe
| 350697 ||  || — || November 17, 2001 || Socorro || LINEAR || NYS || align=right data-sort-value="0.72" | 720 m || 
|-id=698 bgcolor=#fefefe
| 350698 ||  || — || November 21, 2001 || Socorro || LINEAR || PHO || align=right | 1.8 km || 
|-id=699 bgcolor=#d6d6d6
| 350699 ||  || — || November 17, 2001 || Socorro || LINEAR || — || align=right | 3.2 km || 
|-id=700 bgcolor=#fefefe
| 350700 ||  || — || November 17, 2001 || Socorro || LINEAR || FLO || align=right data-sort-value="0.73" | 730 m || 
|}

350701–350800 

|-bgcolor=#d6d6d6
| 350701 ||  || — || November 17, 2001 || Socorro || LINEAR || — || align=right | 3.7 km || 
|-id=702 bgcolor=#d6d6d6
| 350702 ||  || — || November 18, 2001 || Socorro || LINEAR || — || align=right | 3.0 km || 
|-id=703 bgcolor=#fefefe
| 350703 ||  || — || November 20, 2001 || Socorro || LINEAR || FLO || align=right data-sort-value="0.70" | 700 m || 
|-id=704 bgcolor=#fefefe
| 350704 ||  || — || November 20, 2001 || Socorro || LINEAR || — || align=right data-sort-value="0.67" | 670 m || 
|-id=705 bgcolor=#fefefe
| 350705 ||  || — || November 20, 2001 || Socorro || LINEAR || — || align=right data-sort-value="0.65" | 650 m || 
|-id=706 bgcolor=#fefefe
| 350706 ||  || — || November 20, 2001 || Socorro || LINEAR || MAS || align=right data-sort-value="0.78" | 780 m || 
|-id=707 bgcolor=#fefefe
| 350707 ||  || — || November 20, 2001 || Socorro || LINEAR || NYS || align=right data-sort-value="0.67" | 670 m || 
|-id=708 bgcolor=#d6d6d6
| 350708 ||  || — || December 9, 2001 || Socorro || LINEAR || — || align=right | 3.9 km || 
|-id=709 bgcolor=#fefefe
| 350709 ||  || — || December 10, 2001 || Socorro || LINEAR || — || align=right | 1.0 km || 
|-id=710 bgcolor=#d6d6d6
| 350710 ||  || — || December 11, 2001 || Socorro || LINEAR || — || align=right | 3.2 km || 
|-id=711 bgcolor=#fefefe
| 350711 ||  || — || December 11, 2001 || Socorro || LINEAR || — || align=right | 1.1 km || 
|-id=712 bgcolor=#d6d6d6
| 350712 ||  || — || December 11, 2001 || Socorro || LINEAR || EUP || align=right | 4.9 km || 
|-id=713 bgcolor=#FFC2E0
| 350713 ||  || — || December 14, 2001 || Socorro || LINEAR || AMO || align=right data-sort-value="0.27" | 270 m || 
|-id=714 bgcolor=#fefefe
| 350714 ||  || — || December 10, 2001 || Socorro || LINEAR || — || align=right data-sort-value="0.94" | 940 m || 
|-id=715 bgcolor=#fefefe
| 350715 ||  || — || December 10, 2001 || Socorro || LINEAR || — || align=right | 1.0 km || 
|-id=716 bgcolor=#fefefe
| 350716 ||  || — || December 15, 2001 || Socorro || LINEAR || H || align=right data-sort-value="0.77" | 770 m || 
|-id=717 bgcolor=#fefefe
| 350717 ||  || — || December 11, 2001 || Socorro || LINEAR || — || align=right data-sort-value="0.83" | 830 m || 
|-id=718 bgcolor=#d6d6d6
| 350718 ||  || — || December 13, 2001 || Socorro || LINEAR || — || align=right | 3.7 km || 
|-id=719 bgcolor=#fefefe
| 350719 ||  || — || November 17, 2001 || Socorro || LINEAR || ERI || align=right | 1.4 km || 
|-id=720 bgcolor=#fefefe
| 350720 ||  || — || December 14, 2001 || Socorro || LINEAR || NYS || align=right data-sort-value="0.63" | 630 m || 
|-id=721 bgcolor=#d6d6d6
| 350721 ||  || — || December 14, 2001 || Socorro || LINEAR || — || align=right | 3.9 km || 
|-id=722 bgcolor=#fefefe
| 350722 ||  || — || December 14, 2001 || Socorro || LINEAR || — || align=right data-sort-value="0.86" | 860 m || 
|-id=723 bgcolor=#fefefe
| 350723 ||  || — || December 14, 2001 || Socorro || LINEAR || ERI || align=right | 2.2 km || 
|-id=724 bgcolor=#fefefe
| 350724 ||  || — || December 14, 2001 || Socorro || LINEAR || NYS || align=right data-sort-value="0.76" | 760 m || 
|-id=725 bgcolor=#fefefe
| 350725 ||  || — || December 14, 2001 || Socorro || LINEAR || V || align=right data-sort-value="0.74" | 740 m || 
|-id=726 bgcolor=#d6d6d6
| 350726 ||  || — || December 14, 2001 || Socorro || LINEAR || EOS || align=right | 2.4 km || 
|-id=727 bgcolor=#fefefe
| 350727 ||  || — || December 14, 2001 || Socorro || LINEAR || MAS || align=right data-sort-value="0.87" | 870 m || 
|-id=728 bgcolor=#fefefe
| 350728 ||  || — || December 14, 2001 || Socorro || LINEAR || ERI || align=right | 2.1 km || 
|-id=729 bgcolor=#fefefe
| 350729 ||  || — || December 14, 2001 || Socorro || LINEAR || H || align=right | 1.0 km || 
|-id=730 bgcolor=#d6d6d6
| 350730 ||  || — || December 11, 2001 || Socorro || LINEAR || — || align=right | 3.4 km || 
|-id=731 bgcolor=#d6d6d6
| 350731 ||  || — || December 15, 2001 || Socorro || LINEAR || — || align=right | 2.8 km || 
|-id=732 bgcolor=#d6d6d6
| 350732 ||  || — || December 15, 2001 || Socorro || LINEAR || EMA || align=right | 3.9 km || 
|-id=733 bgcolor=#fefefe
| 350733 ||  || — || December 15, 2001 || Socorro || LINEAR || NYS || align=right data-sort-value="0.71" | 710 m || 
|-id=734 bgcolor=#d6d6d6
| 350734 ||  || — || December 14, 2001 || Socorro || LINEAR || — || align=right | 4.2 km || 
|-id=735 bgcolor=#d6d6d6
| 350735 ||  || — || December 7, 2001 || Socorro || LINEAR || — || align=right | 3.0 km || 
|-id=736 bgcolor=#d6d6d6
| 350736 ||  || — || December 17, 2001 || Socorro || LINEAR || Tj (2.96) || align=right | 2.8 km || 
|-id=737 bgcolor=#fefefe
| 350737 ||  || — || December 18, 2001 || Socorro || LINEAR || ERI || align=right | 1.2 km || 
|-id=738 bgcolor=#fefefe
| 350738 ||  || — || December 18, 2001 || Socorro || LINEAR || NYS || align=right data-sort-value="0.65" | 650 m || 
|-id=739 bgcolor=#fefefe
| 350739 ||  || — || December 18, 2001 || Socorro || LINEAR || — || align=right data-sort-value="0.88" | 880 m || 
|-id=740 bgcolor=#d6d6d6
| 350740 ||  || — || December 18, 2001 || Socorro || LINEAR || — || align=right | 3.8 km || 
|-id=741 bgcolor=#d6d6d6
| 350741 ||  || — || December 18, 2001 || Socorro || LINEAR || — || align=right | 4.5 km || 
|-id=742 bgcolor=#fefefe
| 350742 ||  || — || December 18, 2001 || Socorro || LINEAR || — || align=right data-sort-value="0.69" | 690 m || 
|-id=743 bgcolor=#fefefe
| 350743 ||  || — || December 18, 2001 || Socorro || LINEAR || MAS || align=right data-sort-value="0.82" | 820 m || 
|-id=744 bgcolor=#fefefe
| 350744 ||  || — || December 18, 2001 || Socorro || LINEAR || — || align=right data-sort-value="0.90" | 900 m || 
|-id=745 bgcolor=#fefefe
| 350745 ||  || — || December 17, 2001 || Socorro || LINEAR || — || align=right data-sort-value="0.87" | 870 m || 
|-id=746 bgcolor=#fefefe
| 350746 ||  || — || December 17, 2001 || Socorro || LINEAR || ERI || align=right | 1.6 km || 
|-id=747 bgcolor=#fefefe
| 350747 ||  || — || December 17, 2001 || Socorro || LINEAR || — || align=right | 1.1 km || 
|-id=748 bgcolor=#d6d6d6
| 350748 ||  || — || December 17, 2001 || Socorro || LINEAR || — || align=right | 4.4 km || 
|-id=749 bgcolor=#d6d6d6
| 350749 ||  || — || December 19, 2001 || Palomar || NEAT || TIR || align=right | 3.2 km || 
|-id=750 bgcolor=#fefefe
| 350750 ||  || — || December 18, 2001 || Apache Point || SDSS || H || align=right | 1.0 km || 
|-id=751 bgcolor=#FFC2E0
| 350751 ||  || — || January 5, 2002 || Kitt Peak || Spacewatch || APOPHA || align=right data-sort-value="0.25" | 250 m || 
|-id=752 bgcolor=#fefefe
| 350752 ||  || — || January 9, 2002 || Socorro || LINEAR || H || align=right data-sort-value="0.94" | 940 m || 
|-id=753 bgcolor=#fefefe
| 350753 ||  || — || January 5, 2002 || Palomar || NEAT || H || align=right | 1.00 km || 
|-id=754 bgcolor=#d6d6d6
| 350754 ||  || — || January 7, 2002 || Anderson Mesa || LONEOS || — || align=right | 4.0 km || 
|-id=755 bgcolor=#d6d6d6
| 350755 ||  || — || January 12, 2002 || Kitt Peak || Spacewatch || THM || align=right | 2.5 km || 
|-id=756 bgcolor=#fefefe
| 350756 ||  || — || January 9, 2002 || Socorro || LINEAR || NYS || align=right data-sort-value="0.69" | 690 m || 
|-id=757 bgcolor=#d6d6d6
| 350757 ||  || — || January 9, 2002 || Socorro || LINEAR || THM || align=right | 2.7 km || 
|-id=758 bgcolor=#fefefe
| 350758 ||  || — || January 9, 2002 || Socorro || LINEAR || NYS || align=right data-sort-value="0.93" | 930 m || 
|-id=759 bgcolor=#fefefe
| 350759 ||  || — || January 13, 2002 || Socorro || LINEAR || — || align=right data-sort-value="0.98" | 980 m || 
|-id=760 bgcolor=#fefefe
| 350760 ||  || — || January 8, 2002 || Socorro || LINEAR || NYS || align=right data-sort-value="0.78" | 780 m || 
|-id=761 bgcolor=#fefefe
| 350761 ||  || — || January 8, 2002 || Socorro || LINEAR || — || align=right data-sort-value="0.95" | 950 m || 
|-id=762 bgcolor=#d6d6d6
| 350762 ||  || — || January 8, 2002 || Socorro || LINEAR || — || align=right | 2.7 km || 
|-id=763 bgcolor=#d6d6d6
| 350763 ||  || — || January 8, 2002 || Socorro || LINEAR || 637 || align=right | 2.8 km || 
|-id=764 bgcolor=#d6d6d6
| 350764 ||  || — || January 9, 2002 || Socorro || LINEAR || — || align=right | 4.1 km || 
|-id=765 bgcolor=#fefefe
| 350765 ||  || — || January 9, 2002 || Socorro || LINEAR || — || align=right data-sort-value="0.90" | 900 m || 
|-id=766 bgcolor=#fefefe
| 350766 ||  || — || January 13, 2002 || Socorro || LINEAR || — || align=right data-sort-value="0.86" | 860 m || 
|-id=767 bgcolor=#d6d6d6
| 350767 ||  || — || January 14, 2002 || Socorro || LINEAR || Tj (2.93) || align=right | 4.7 km || 
|-id=768 bgcolor=#d6d6d6
| 350768 ||  || — || January 14, 2002 || Socorro || LINEAR || — || align=right | 3.4 km || 
|-id=769 bgcolor=#fefefe
| 350769 ||  || — || January 6, 2002 || Palomar || NEAT || MAS || align=right data-sort-value="0.81" | 810 m || 
|-id=770 bgcolor=#d6d6d6
| 350770 ||  || — || January 12, 2002 || Campo Imperatore || CINEOS || THM || align=right | 2.0 km || 
|-id=771 bgcolor=#fefefe
| 350771 ||  || — || January 19, 2002 || Socorro || LINEAR || V || align=right data-sort-value="0.96" | 960 m || 
|-id=772 bgcolor=#d6d6d6
| 350772 ||  || — || January 25, 2002 || Palomar || NEAT || — || align=right | 3.0 km || 
|-id=773 bgcolor=#d6d6d6
| 350773 ||  || — || January 18, 2002 || Anderson Mesa || LONEOS || EUP || align=right | 6.9 km || 
|-id=774 bgcolor=#d6d6d6
| 350774 ||  || — || January 26, 2002 || Palomar || NEAT || — || align=right | 4.9 km || 
|-id=775 bgcolor=#fefefe
| 350775 ||  || — || February 4, 2002 || Palomar || NEAT || ERI || align=right | 1.9 km || 
|-id=776 bgcolor=#fefefe
| 350776 ||  || — || February 1, 2002 || Socorro || LINEAR || H || align=right data-sort-value="0.93" | 930 m || 
|-id=777 bgcolor=#fefefe
| 350777 ||  || — || February 6, 2002 || Socorro || LINEAR || PHO || align=right | 1.3 km || 
|-id=778 bgcolor=#fefefe
| 350778 ||  || — || February 2, 2002 || Eskridge || G. Hug || — || align=right data-sort-value="0.83" | 830 m || 
|-id=779 bgcolor=#fefefe
| 350779 ||  || — || February 5, 2002 || Palomar || NEAT || MAS || align=right data-sort-value="0.85" | 850 m || 
|-id=780 bgcolor=#fefefe
| 350780 ||  || — || February 10, 2002 || Socorro || LINEAR || H || align=right data-sort-value="0.94" | 940 m || 
|-id=781 bgcolor=#d6d6d6
| 350781 ||  || — || February 6, 2002 || Socorro || LINEAR || — || align=right | 3.7 km || 
|-id=782 bgcolor=#fefefe
| 350782 ||  || — || February 7, 2002 || Socorro || LINEAR || ERI || align=right | 1.7 km || 
|-id=783 bgcolor=#fefefe
| 350783 ||  || — || February 3, 2002 || Haleakala || NEAT || — || align=right | 1.3 km || 
|-id=784 bgcolor=#fefefe
| 350784 ||  || — || February 7, 2002 || Socorro || LINEAR || — || align=right data-sort-value="0.83" | 830 m || 
|-id=785 bgcolor=#fefefe
| 350785 ||  || — || February 7, 2002 || Socorro || LINEAR || EUT || align=right data-sort-value="0.84" | 840 m || 
|-id=786 bgcolor=#fefefe
| 350786 ||  || — || February 7, 2002 || Socorro || LINEAR || NYS || align=right data-sort-value="0.88" | 880 m || 
|-id=787 bgcolor=#d6d6d6
| 350787 ||  || — || February 7, 2002 || Socorro || LINEAR || — || align=right | 6.3 km || 
|-id=788 bgcolor=#fefefe
| 350788 ||  || — || February 7, 2002 || Socorro || LINEAR || NYS || align=right data-sort-value="0.73" | 730 m || 
|-id=789 bgcolor=#d6d6d6
| 350789 ||  || — || February 13, 2002 || Socorro || LINEAR || EUP || align=right | 4.6 km || 
|-id=790 bgcolor=#fefefe
| 350790 ||  || — || February 7, 2002 || Socorro || LINEAR || — || align=right | 1.0 km || 
|-id=791 bgcolor=#fefefe
| 350791 ||  || — || February 7, 2002 || Socorro || LINEAR || NYS || align=right data-sort-value="0.91" | 910 m || 
|-id=792 bgcolor=#fefefe
| 350792 ||  || — || February 7, 2002 || Socorro || LINEAR || V || align=right data-sort-value="0.98" | 980 m || 
|-id=793 bgcolor=#d6d6d6
| 350793 ||  || — || February 10, 2002 || Socorro || LINEAR || — || align=right | 3.6 km || 
|-id=794 bgcolor=#C2FFFF
| 350794 ||  || — || February 7, 2002 || Socorro || LINEAR || L4 || align=right | 13 km || 
|-id=795 bgcolor=#fefefe
| 350795 ||  || — || February 8, 2002 || Socorro || LINEAR || — || align=right | 1.5 km || 
|-id=796 bgcolor=#d6d6d6
| 350796 ||  || — || February 10, 2002 || Socorro || LINEAR || — || align=right | 3.7 km || 
|-id=797 bgcolor=#d6d6d6
| 350797 ||  || — || February 10, 2002 || Socorro || LINEAR || — || align=right | 3.1 km || 
|-id=798 bgcolor=#fefefe
| 350798 ||  || — || February 10, 2002 || Socorro || LINEAR || — || align=right data-sort-value="0.85" | 850 m || 
|-id=799 bgcolor=#fefefe
| 350799 ||  || — || February 10, 2002 || Socorro || LINEAR || NYS || align=right data-sort-value="0.67" | 670 m || 
|-id=800 bgcolor=#d6d6d6
| 350800 ||  || — || February 10, 2002 || Socorro || LINEAR || — || align=right | 3.0 km || 
|}

350801–350900 

|-bgcolor=#C2FFFF
| 350801 ||  || — || January 14, 2002 || Socorro || LINEAR || L4 || align=right | 12 km || 
|-id=802 bgcolor=#fefefe
| 350802 ||  || — || February 10, 2002 || Socorro || LINEAR || — || align=right data-sort-value="0.99" | 990 m || 
|-id=803 bgcolor=#fefefe
| 350803 ||  || — || February 10, 2002 || Socorro || LINEAR || NYS || align=right data-sort-value="0.72" | 720 m || 
|-id=804 bgcolor=#d6d6d6
| 350804 ||  || — || February 10, 2002 || Socorro || LINEAR || VER || align=right | 2.7 km || 
|-id=805 bgcolor=#d6d6d6
| 350805 ||  || — || February 10, 2002 || Socorro || LINEAR || — || align=right | 4.1 km || 
|-id=806 bgcolor=#fefefe
| 350806 ||  || — || February 10, 2002 || Socorro || LINEAR || NYS || align=right data-sort-value="0.74" | 740 m || 
|-id=807 bgcolor=#d6d6d6
| 350807 ||  || — || February 11, 2002 || Kitt Peak || Spacewatch || THM || align=right | 2.3 km || 
|-id=808 bgcolor=#d6d6d6
| 350808 ||  || — || February 14, 2002 || Kitt Peak || Spacewatch || — || align=right | 3.7 km || 
|-id=809 bgcolor=#d6d6d6
| 350809 ||  || — || February 6, 2002 || Kitt Peak || M. W. Buie || EOS || align=right | 2.3 km || 
|-id=810 bgcolor=#fefefe
| 350810 ||  || — || January 7, 2002 || Kitt Peak || Spacewatch || — || align=right data-sort-value="0.68" | 680 m || 
|-id=811 bgcolor=#d6d6d6
| 350811 ||  || — || February 7, 2002 || Kitt Peak || Spacewatch || — || align=right | 2.2 km || 
|-id=812 bgcolor=#d6d6d6
| 350812 ||  || — || February 9, 2002 || Palomar || NEAT || — || align=right | 4.3 km || 
|-id=813 bgcolor=#fefefe
| 350813 ||  || — || February 9, 2002 || Kitt Peak || Spacewatch || CHL || align=right | 1.8 km || 
|-id=814 bgcolor=#d6d6d6
| 350814 ||  || — || February 9, 2002 || Palomar || NEAT || — || align=right | 4.5 km || 
|-id=815 bgcolor=#fefefe
| 350815 ||  || — || February 11, 2002 || Socorro || LINEAR || MAS || align=right data-sort-value="0.70" | 700 m || 
|-id=816 bgcolor=#fefefe
| 350816 ||  || — || February 11, 2002 || Socorro || LINEAR || NYS || align=right data-sort-value="0.70" | 700 m || 
|-id=817 bgcolor=#d6d6d6
| 350817 ||  || — || February 6, 2002 || Palomar || NEAT || THB || align=right | 2.4 km || 
|-id=818 bgcolor=#fefefe
| 350818 ||  || — || February 6, 2002 || Palomar || NEAT || V || align=right data-sort-value="0.79" | 790 m || 
|-id=819 bgcolor=#d6d6d6
| 350819 || 2002 DO || — || February 16, 2002 || Bohyunsan || Y.-B. Jeon, B.-C. Lee || VER || align=right | 3.3 km || 
|-id=820 bgcolor=#fefefe
| 350820 ||  || — || February 16, 2002 || Palomar || NEAT || — || align=right data-sort-value="0.88" | 880 m || 
|-id=821 bgcolor=#d6d6d6
| 350821 ||  || — || February 6, 2002 || Palomar || NEAT || — || align=right | 4.1 km || 
|-id=822 bgcolor=#d6d6d6
| 350822 ||  || — || March 9, 2002 || Palomar || NEAT || EUP || align=right | 6.1 km || 
|-id=823 bgcolor=#fefefe
| 350823 ||  || — || March 10, 2002 || Kitt Peak || Spacewatch || NYS || align=right data-sort-value="0.65" | 650 m || 
|-id=824 bgcolor=#fefefe
| 350824 ||  || — || March 12, 2002 || Kitt Peak || Spacewatch || V || align=right data-sort-value="0.87" | 870 m || 
|-id=825 bgcolor=#C2FFFF
| 350825 ||  || — || January 14, 2002 || Kitt Peak || Spacewatch || L4ERY || align=right | 8.8 km || 
|-id=826 bgcolor=#d6d6d6
| 350826 ||  || — || March 9, 2002 || Socorro || LINEAR || — || align=right | 4.2 km || 
|-id=827 bgcolor=#d6d6d6
| 350827 ||  || — || March 13, 2002 || Socorro || LINEAR || — || align=right | 3.6 km || 
|-id=828 bgcolor=#fefefe
| 350828 ||  || — || March 11, 2002 || Socorro || LINEAR || — || align=right | 2.6 km || 
|-id=829 bgcolor=#fefefe
| 350829 ||  || — || March 15, 2002 || Socorro || LINEAR || — || align=right data-sort-value="0.84" | 840 m || 
|-id=830 bgcolor=#fefefe
| 350830 ||  || — || March 9, 2002 || Palomar || NEAT || NYS || align=right data-sort-value="0.60" | 600 m || 
|-id=831 bgcolor=#d6d6d6
| 350831 ||  || — || March 9, 2002 || Palomar || NEAT || — || align=right | 4.0 km || 
|-id=832 bgcolor=#d6d6d6
| 350832 ||  || — || March 9, 2002 || Anderson Mesa || LONEOS || EOS || align=right | 2.8 km || 
|-id=833 bgcolor=#fefefe
| 350833 ||  || — || March 9, 2002 || Kitt Peak || Spacewatch || — || align=right data-sort-value="0.81" | 810 m || 
|-id=834 bgcolor=#fefefe
| 350834 ||  || — || March 11, 2002 || Kitt Peak || Spacewatch || — || align=right | 1.0 km || 
|-id=835 bgcolor=#fefefe
| 350835 ||  || — || March 12, 2002 || Palomar || NEAT || — || align=right data-sort-value="0.78" | 780 m || 
|-id=836 bgcolor=#C2FFFF
| 350836 ||  || — || March 13, 2002 || Palomar || NEAT || L4 || align=right | 8.4 km || 
|-id=837 bgcolor=#fefefe
| 350837 ||  || — || March 5, 2002 || Apache Point || SDSS || MAS || align=right data-sort-value="0.78" | 780 m || 
|-id=838 bgcolor=#d6d6d6
| 350838 Gorelysheva ||  ||  || October 27, 2011 || Zelenchukskaya || T. V. Kryachko || — || align=right | 4.3 km || 
|-id=839 bgcolor=#fefefe
| 350839 ||  || — || March 22, 2002 || Palomar || NEAT || — || align=right | 1.0 km || 
|-id=840 bgcolor=#d6d6d6
| 350840 ||  || — || March 17, 2002 || Haleakala || NEAT || — || align=right | 4.0 km || 
|-id=841 bgcolor=#d6d6d6
| 350841 ||  || — || March 19, 2002 || Palomar || NEAT || TIR || align=right | 3.8 km || 
|-id=842 bgcolor=#fefefe
| 350842 ||  || — || March 31, 2002 || Palomar || NEAT || — || align=right | 1.2 km || 
|-id=843 bgcolor=#d6d6d6
| 350843 ||  || — || April 4, 2002 || Palomar || NEAT || Tj (2.95) || align=right | 7.4 km || 
|-id=844 bgcolor=#fefefe
| 350844 ||  || — || April 4, 2002 || Palomar || NEAT || — || align=right | 1.1 km || 
|-id=845 bgcolor=#d6d6d6
| 350845 ||  || — || April 5, 2002 || Palomar || NEAT || — || align=right | 4.1 km || 
|-id=846 bgcolor=#d6d6d6
| 350846 ||  || — || April 6, 2002 || Kvistaberg || UDAS || — || align=right | 5.5 km || 
|-id=847 bgcolor=#fefefe
| 350847 ||  || — || April 8, 2002 || Palomar || NEAT || NYS || align=right data-sort-value="0.83" | 830 m || 
|-id=848 bgcolor=#fefefe
| 350848 ||  || — || April 8, 2002 || Palomar || NEAT || V || align=right data-sort-value="0.92" | 920 m || 
|-id=849 bgcolor=#fefefe
| 350849 ||  || — || April 9, 2002 || Socorro || LINEAR || — || align=right | 1.0 km || 
|-id=850 bgcolor=#fefefe
| 350850 ||  || — || April 10, 2002 || Socorro || LINEAR || MAS || align=right data-sort-value="0.90" | 900 m || 
|-id=851 bgcolor=#d6d6d6
| 350851 ||  || — || April 11, 2002 || Anderson Mesa || LONEOS || — || align=right | 4.3 km || 
|-id=852 bgcolor=#fefefe
| 350852 ||  || — || April 2, 2002 || Palomar || NEAT || — || align=right | 1.1 km || 
|-id=853 bgcolor=#fefefe
| 350853 ||  || — || May 10, 2002 || Anderson Mesa || LONEOS || — || align=right | 1.8 km || 
|-id=854 bgcolor=#fefefe
| 350854 ||  || — || May 10, 2002 || Anderson Mesa || LONEOS || — || align=right data-sort-value="0.99" | 990 m || 
|-id=855 bgcolor=#E9E9E9
| 350855 ||  || — || June 10, 2002 || Socorro || LINEAR || — || align=right | 4.4 km || 
|-id=856 bgcolor=#E9E9E9
| 350856 ||  || — || June 13, 2002 || Palomar || NEAT || — || align=right | 2.6 km || 
|-id=857 bgcolor=#E9E9E9
| 350857 ||  || — || March 16, 2010 || WISE || WISE || — || align=right | 4.0 km || 
|-id=858 bgcolor=#E9E9E9
| 350858 ||  || — || July 10, 2002 || Campo Imperatore || CINEOS || EUN || align=right | 1.1 km || 
|-id=859 bgcolor=#E9E9E9
| 350859 ||  || — || July 5, 2002 || Socorro || LINEAR || JUN || align=right | 1.1 km || 
|-id=860 bgcolor=#E9E9E9
| 350860 ||  || — || July 9, 2002 || Socorro || LINEAR || EUN || align=right | 1.5 km || 
|-id=861 bgcolor=#E9E9E9
| 350861 ||  || — || June 20, 2002 || Palomar || NEAT || MAR || align=right | 1.5 km || 
|-id=862 bgcolor=#E9E9E9
| 350862 ||  || — || July 12, 2002 || Palomar || NEAT || — || align=right | 1.9 km || 
|-id=863 bgcolor=#E9E9E9
| 350863 ||  || — || July 9, 2002 || Palomar || NEAT || — || align=right | 1.6 km || 
|-id=864 bgcolor=#fefefe
| 350864 ||  || — || December 14, 2003 || Kitt Peak || Spacewatch || — || align=right | 1.3 km || 
|-id=865 bgcolor=#E9E9E9
| 350865 ||  || — || October 17, 2011 || Piszkéstető || K. Sárneczky, A. Szing || EUN || align=right | 1.3 km || 
|-id=866 bgcolor=#E9E9E9
| 350866 ||  || — || January 16, 2009 || Kitt Peak || Spacewatch || AER || align=right | 1.5 km || 
|-id=867 bgcolor=#E9E9E9
| 350867 ||  || — || July 20, 2002 || Palomar || NEAT || — || align=right | 3.7 km || 
|-id=868 bgcolor=#E9E9E9
| 350868 ||  || — || July 22, 2002 || Palomar || NEAT || — || align=right | 1.3 km || 
|-id=869 bgcolor=#E9E9E9
| 350869 ||  || — || April 2, 2010 || WISE || WISE || — || align=right | 1.0 km || 
|-id=870 bgcolor=#E9E9E9
| 350870 ||  || — || December 21, 2008 || Kitt Peak || Spacewatch || PAD || align=right | 1.6 km || 
|-id=871 bgcolor=#E9E9E9
| 350871 ||  || — || August 5, 2002 || Palomar || NEAT || ADE || align=right | 2.1 km || 
|-id=872 bgcolor=#FFC2E0
| 350872 ||  || — || August 10, 2002 || Socorro || LINEAR || AMO +1km || align=right data-sort-value="0.80" | 800 m || 
|-id=873 bgcolor=#E9E9E9
| 350873 ||  || — || August 4, 2002 || Palomar || NEAT || BRU || align=right | 3.3 km || 
|-id=874 bgcolor=#E9E9E9
| 350874 ||  || — || August 12, 2002 || Socorro || LINEAR || — || align=right | 2.3 km || 
|-id=875 bgcolor=#E9E9E9
| 350875 ||  || — || August 8, 2002 || Palomar || NEAT || EUN || align=right | 1.5 km || 
|-id=876 bgcolor=#E9E9E9
| 350876 ||  || — || August 11, 2002 || Palomar || NEAT || — || align=right | 1.8 km || 
|-id=877 bgcolor=#E9E9E9
| 350877 ||  || — || August 19, 2002 || Palomar || NEAT || — || align=right | 2.8 km || 
|-id=878 bgcolor=#E9E9E9
| 350878 ||  || — || August 26, 2002 || Palomar || NEAT || INO || align=right | 1.3 km || 
|-id=879 bgcolor=#E9E9E9
| 350879 ||  || — || August 29, 2002 || Palomar || NEAT || DOR || align=right | 2.4 km || 
|-id=880 bgcolor=#E9E9E9
| 350880 ||  || — || August 29, 2002 || Palomar || S. F. Hönig || — || align=right | 1.6 km || 
|-id=881 bgcolor=#E9E9E9
| 350881 ||  || — || August 17, 2002 || Palomar || A. Lowe || DOR || align=right | 2.2 km || 
|-id=882 bgcolor=#E9E9E9
| 350882 ||  || — || August 29, 2002 || Palomar || S. F. Hönig || — || align=right | 2.3 km || 
|-id=883 bgcolor=#E9E9E9
| 350883 ||  || — || August 19, 2002 || Palomar || NEAT || WIT || align=right | 1.1 km || 
|-id=884 bgcolor=#E9E9E9
| 350884 ||  || — || August 26, 2002 || Palomar || NEAT || — || align=right | 2.5 km || 
|-id=885 bgcolor=#E9E9E9
| 350885 ||  || — || August 30, 2002 || Palomar || Palomar Obs. || — || align=right | 1.9 km || 
|-id=886 bgcolor=#E9E9E9
| 350886 ||  || — || August 18, 2002 || Palomar || NEAT || — || align=right | 1.4 km || 
|-id=887 bgcolor=#E9E9E9
| 350887 ||  || — || August 16, 2002 || Palomar || NEAT || — || align=right | 2.1 km || 
|-id=888 bgcolor=#E9E9E9
| 350888 ||  || — || August 16, 2002 || Palomar || NEAT || — || align=right | 1.9 km || 
|-id=889 bgcolor=#E9E9E9
| 350889 ||  || — || August 18, 2002 || Palomar || NEAT || EUN || align=right | 1.5 km || 
|-id=890 bgcolor=#E9E9E9
| 350890 ||  || — || July 21, 2006 || Mount Lemmon || Mount Lemmon Survey || MAR || align=right | 1.5 km || 
|-id=891 bgcolor=#E9E9E9
| 350891 ||  || — || October 7, 2007 || Kitt Peak || Spacewatch || — || align=right | 2.4 km || 
|-id=892 bgcolor=#E9E9E9
| 350892 ||  || — || February 14, 2005 || Kitt Peak || Spacewatch || — || align=right | 1.0 km || 
|-id=893 bgcolor=#E9E9E9
| 350893 ||  || — || November 19, 2007 || Catalina || CSS || — || align=right | 2.7 km || 
|-id=894 bgcolor=#E9E9E9
| 350894 ||  || — || December 22, 2008 || Kitt Peak || Spacewatch || — || align=right | 2.2 km || 
|-id=895 bgcolor=#E9E9E9
| 350895 ||  || — || May 5, 2010 || Mount Lemmon || Mount Lemmon Survey || WIT || align=right | 1.2 km || 
|-id=896 bgcolor=#E9E9E9
| 350896 ||  || — || October 7, 2007 || Mount Lemmon || Mount Lemmon Survey || — || align=right | 1.6 km || 
|-id=897 bgcolor=#E9E9E9
| 350897 ||  || — || September 1, 2002 || Palomar || NEAT || — || align=right | 2.4 km || 
|-id=898 bgcolor=#E9E9E9
| 350898 ||  || — || July 18, 2002 || Socorro || LINEAR || — || align=right | 2.2 km || 
|-id=899 bgcolor=#E9E9E9
| 350899 ||  || — || August 4, 2002 || Palomar || NEAT || — || align=right | 1.8 km || 
|-id=900 bgcolor=#E9E9E9
| 350900 ||  || — || September 2, 2002 || Kitt Peak || Spacewatch || ADE || align=right | 2.8 km || 
|}

350901–351000 

|-bgcolor=#E9E9E9
| 350901 ||  || — || September 4, 2002 || Palomar || NEAT || CLO || align=right | 2.9 km || 
|-id=902 bgcolor=#E9E9E9
| 350902 ||  || — || September 5, 2002 || Socorro || LINEAR || — || align=right | 2.5 km || 
|-id=903 bgcolor=#E9E9E9
| 350903 ||  || — || September 5, 2002 || Socorro || LINEAR || — || align=right | 1.8 km || 
|-id=904 bgcolor=#E9E9E9
| 350904 ||  || — || September 5, 2002 || Anderson Mesa || LONEOS || — || align=right | 2.5 km || 
|-id=905 bgcolor=#E9E9E9
| 350905 ||  || — || August 16, 2002 || Socorro || LINEAR || — || align=right | 2.7 km || 
|-id=906 bgcolor=#E9E9E9
| 350906 ||  || — || September 11, 2002 || Palomar || NEAT || — || align=right | 1.8 km || 
|-id=907 bgcolor=#E9E9E9
| 350907 ||  || — || September 13, 2002 || Palomar || NEAT || — || align=right | 3.2 km || 
|-id=908 bgcolor=#E9E9E9
| 350908 ||  || — || September 14, 2002 || Haleakala || NEAT || — || align=right | 1.4 km || 
|-id=909 bgcolor=#E9E9E9
| 350909 ||  || — || August 29, 2002 || Palomar || R. Matson || — || align=right | 1.6 km || 
|-id=910 bgcolor=#E9E9E9
| 350910 ||  || — || September 14, 2002 || Palomar || NEAT || — || align=right | 2.2 km || 
|-id=911 bgcolor=#E9E9E9
| 350911 ||  || — || September 4, 2002 || Palomar || NEAT || — || align=right | 1.8 km || 
|-id=912 bgcolor=#E9E9E9
| 350912 ||  || — || September 11, 2002 || Palomar || NEAT || — || align=right | 2.3 km || 
|-id=913 bgcolor=#E9E9E9
| 350913 ||  || — || September 3, 2002 || Palomar || NEAT || GEF || align=right | 1.5 km || 
|-id=914 bgcolor=#E9E9E9
| 350914 ||  || — || September 4, 2002 || Palomar || NEAT || — || align=right | 2.1 km || 
|-id=915 bgcolor=#E9E9E9
| 350915 ||  || — || September 4, 2002 || Anderson Mesa || LONEOS || EUN || align=right | 1.9 km || 
|-id=916 bgcolor=#E9E9E9
| 350916 ||  || — || February 20, 2009 || Mount Lemmon || Mount Lemmon Survey || — || align=right | 2.1 km || 
|-id=917 bgcolor=#E9E9E9
| 350917 ||  || — || January 19, 2004 || Kitt Peak || Spacewatch || — || align=right | 2.4 km || 
|-id=918 bgcolor=#E9E9E9
| 350918 ||  || — || October 17, 2007 || Catalina || CSS || — || align=right | 3.2 km || 
|-id=919 bgcolor=#E9E9E9
| 350919 ||  || — || September 5, 2002 || Socorro || LINEAR || GEF || align=right | 1.6 km || 
|-id=920 bgcolor=#E9E9E9
| 350920 ||  || — || September 16, 2002 || Palomar || NEAT || — || align=right | 2.4 km || 
|-id=921 bgcolor=#E9E9E9
| 350921 ||  || — || October 2, 2002 || Socorro || LINEAR || GEF || align=right | 1.4 km || 
|-id=922 bgcolor=#E9E9E9
| 350922 ||  || — || October 2, 2002 || Socorro || LINEAR || WIT || align=right | 1.4 km || 
|-id=923 bgcolor=#d6d6d6
| 350923 ||  || — || October 2, 2002 || Socorro || LINEAR || — || align=right | 4.3 km || 
|-id=924 bgcolor=#E9E9E9
| 350924 ||  || — || October 3, 2002 || Palomar || NEAT || EUN || align=right | 1.5 km || 
|-id=925 bgcolor=#E9E9E9
| 350925 ||  || — || October 3, 2002 || Palomar || NEAT || — || align=right | 2.2 km || 
|-id=926 bgcolor=#fefefe
| 350926 ||  || — || October 4, 2002 || Socorro || LINEAR || — || align=right data-sort-value="0.78" | 780 m || 
|-id=927 bgcolor=#d6d6d6
| 350927 ||  || — || October 3, 2002 || Palomar || NEAT || — || align=right | 3.4 km || 
|-id=928 bgcolor=#d6d6d6
| 350928 ||  || — || October 5, 2002 || Palomar || NEAT || — || align=right | 4.5 km || 
|-id=929 bgcolor=#E9E9E9
| 350929 ||  || — || August 22, 2002 || Palomar || NEAT || — || align=right | 2.7 km || 
|-id=930 bgcolor=#E9E9E9
| 350930 ||  || — || October 4, 2002 || Socorro || LINEAR || — || align=right | 1.9 km || 
|-id=931 bgcolor=#E9E9E9
| 350931 ||  || — || October 5, 2002 || Socorro || LINEAR || DOR || align=right | 3.2 km || 
|-id=932 bgcolor=#fefefe
| 350932 ||  || — || October 10, 2002 || Socorro || LINEAR || FLO || align=right data-sort-value="0.62" | 620 m || 
|-id=933 bgcolor=#E9E9E9
| 350933 ||  || — || October 4, 2002 || Socorro || LINEAR || — || align=right | 3.5 km || 
|-id=934 bgcolor=#E9E9E9
| 350934 ||  || — || October 11, 2002 || Socorro || LINEAR || — || align=right | 2.3 km || 
|-id=935 bgcolor=#E9E9E9
| 350935 ||  || — || October 5, 2002 || Apache Point || SDSS || — || align=right | 2.2 km || 
|-id=936 bgcolor=#E9E9E9
| 350936 ||  || — || October 10, 2002 || Apache Point || SDSS || AGN || align=right | 1.2 km || 
|-id=937 bgcolor=#E9E9E9
| 350937 ||  || — || October 10, 2002 || Apache Point || SDSS || — || align=right | 2.5 km || 
|-id=938 bgcolor=#E9E9E9
| 350938 ||  || — || October 15, 2002 || Palomar || NEAT || AGN || align=right | 1.2 km || 
|-id=939 bgcolor=#E9E9E9
| 350939 ||  || — || October 31, 2002 || Palomar || NEAT || HNA || align=right | 2.4 km || 
|-id=940 bgcolor=#E9E9E9
| 350940 ||  || — || October 29, 2002 || Apache Point || SDSS || — || align=right | 2.3 km || 
|-id=941 bgcolor=#E9E9E9
| 350941 ||  || — || October 29, 2002 || Apache Point || SDSS || — || align=right | 2.2 km || 
|-id=942 bgcolor=#E9E9E9
| 350942 ||  || — || November 5, 2002 || Socorro || LINEAR || — || align=right | 3.3 km || 
|-id=943 bgcolor=#fefefe
| 350943 ||  || — || November 5, 2002 || Socorro || LINEAR || FLO || align=right data-sort-value="0.90" | 900 m || 
|-id=944 bgcolor=#E9E9E9
| 350944 ||  || — || November 5, 2002 || Socorro || LINEAR || — || align=right | 2.8 km || 
|-id=945 bgcolor=#E9E9E9
| 350945 ||  || — || October 5, 2002 || Socorro || LINEAR || GEF || align=right | 1.6 km || 
|-id=946 bgcolor=#fefefe
| 350946 ||  || — || November 5, 2002 || Socorro || LINEAR || — || align=right data-sort-value="0.71" | 710 m || 
|-id=947 bgcolor=#fefefe
| 350947 ||  || — || November 10, 2002 || Socorro || LINEAR || FLO || align=right data-sort-value="0.84" | 840 m || 
|-id=948 bgcolor=#E9E9E9
| 350948 ||  || — || November 6, 2002 || Socorro || LINEAR || CLO || align=right | 2.8 km || 
|-id=949 bgcolor=#fefefe
| 350949 ||  || — || November 6, 2002 || Anderson Mesa || LONEOS || — || align=right data-sort-value="0.76" | 760 m || 
|-id=950 bgcolor=#E9E9E9
| 350950 ||  || — || November 5, 2002 || Palomar || NEAT || HOF || align=right | 3.6 km || 
|-id=951 bgcolor=#fefefe
| 350951 ||  || — || November 1, 2002 || Palomar || NEAT || — || align=right data-sort-value="0.87" | 870 m || 
|-id=952 bgcolor=#d6d6d6
| 350952 ||  || — || November 16, 2002 || Palomar || NEAT || — || align=right | 3.0 km || 
|-id=953 bgcolor=#fefefe
| 350953 ||  || — || December 5, 2002 || Socorro || LINEAR || — || align=right data-sort-value="0.77" | 770 m || 
|-id=954 bgcolor=#d6d6d6
| 350954 ||  || — || December 11, 2002 || Socorro || LINEAR || — || align=right | 2.4 km || 
|-id=955 bgcolor=#d6d6d6
| 350955 ||  || — || December 31, 2002 || Socorro || LINEAR || EOS || align=right | 2.6 km || 
|-id=956 bgcolor=#fefefe
| 350956 ||  || — || January 3, 2003 || Socorro || LINEAR || H || align=right data-sort-value="0.89" | 890 m || 
|-id=957 bgcolor=#d6d6d6
| 350957 ||  || — || January 5, 2003 || Socorro || LINEAR || — || align=right | 3.4 km || 
|-id=958 bgcolor=#d6d6d6
| 350958 ||  || — || January 4, 2003 || Socorro || LINEAR || TEL || align=right | 2.1 km || 
|-id=959 bgcolor=#d6d6d6
| 350959 ||  || — || January 8, 2003 || Socorro || LINEAR || — || align=right | 1.8 km || 
|-id=960 bgcolor=#fefefe
| 350960 ||  || — || January 5, 2003 || Anderson Mesa || LONEOS || — || align=right | 1.1 km || 
|-id=961 bgcolor=#d6d6d6
| 350961 ||  || — || January 5, 2003 || Anderson Mesa || LONEOS || — || align=right | 3.2 km || 
|-id=962 bgcolor=#fefefe
| 350962 ||  || — || January 26, 2003 || Kitt Peak || Spacewatch || — || align=right data-sort-value="0.95" | 950 m || 
|-id=963 bgcolor=#fefefe
| 350963 ||  || — || January 26, 2003 || Haleakala || NEAT || H || align=right data-sort-value="0.92" | 920 m || 
|-id=964 bgcolor=#FFC2E0
| 350964 ||  || — || January 28, 2003 || Socorro || LINEAR || AMO || align=right data-sort-value="0.72" | 720 m || 
|-id=965 bgcolor=#d6d6d6
| 350965 ||  || — || January 30, 2003 || Anderson Mesa || LONEOS || — || align=right | 3.2 km || 
|-id=966 bgcolor=#fefefe
| 350966 ||  || — || January 31, 2003 || Socorro || LINEAR || H || align=right data-sort-value="0.65" | 650 m || 
|-id=967 bgcolor=#fefefe
| 350967 ||  || — || February 1, 2003 || Socorro || LINEAR || — || align=right | 1.5 km || 
|-id=968 bgcolor=#d6d6d6
| 350968 ||  || — || February 6, 2003 || Wrightwood || J. W. Young || — || align=right | 2.5 km || 
|-id=969 bgcolor=#d6d6d6
| 350969 Boiohaemum ||  ||  || February 27, 2003 || Kleť || KLENOT || — || align=right | 2.9 km || 
|-id=970 bgcolor=#fefefe
| 350970 ||  || — || March 5, 2003 || Socorro || LINEAR || H || align=right data-sort-value="0.83" | 830 m || 
|-id=971 bgcolor=#fefefe
| 350971 ||  || — || March 6, 2003 || Socorro || LINEAR || — || align=right | 1.0 km || 
|-id=972 bgcolor=#fefefe
| 350972 ||  || — || March 6, 2003 || Palomar || NEAT || — || align=right data-sort-value="0.82" | 820 m || 
|-id=973 bgcolor=#FA8072
| 350973 ||  || — || March 7, 2003 || Socorro || LINEAR || — || align=right data-sort-value="0.99" | 990 m || 
|-id=974 bgcolor=#d6d6d6
| 350974 ||  || — || March 8, 2003 || Anderson Mesa || LONEOS || — || align=right | 4.5 km || 
|-id=975 bgcolor=#d6d6d6
| 350975 ||  || — || March 9, 2003 || Anderson Mesa || LONEOS || — || align=right | 3.0 km || 
|-id=976 bgcolor=#d6d6d6
| 350976 ||  || — || March 22, 2003 || Palomar || NEAT || — || align=right | 5.1 km || 
|-id=977 bgcolor=#d6d6d6
| 350977 ||  || — || March 23, 2003 || Kitt Peak || Spacewatch || — || align=right | 2.1 km || 
|-id=978 bgcolor=#C2FFFF
| 350978 ||  || — || March 23, 2003 || Kitt Peak || Spacewatch || L4 || align=right | 12 km || 
|-id=979 bgcolor=#fefefe
| 350979 ||  || — || March 24, 2003 || Kitt Peak || Spacewatch || FLO || align=right | 1.6 km || 
|-id=980 bgcolor=#fefefe
| 350980 ||  || — || March 25, 2003 || Palomar || NEAT || FLO || align=right data-sort-value="0.67" | 670 m || 
|-id=981 bgcolor=#d6d6d6
| 350981 ||  || — || March 26, 2003 || Kitt Peak || Spacewatch || — || align=right | 3.2 km || 
|-id=982 bgcolor=#fefefe
| 350982 ||  || — || March 26, 2003 || Kitt Peak || Spacewatch || — || align=right data-sort-value="0.78" | 780 m || 
|-id=983 bgcolor=#d6d6d6
| 350983 ||  || — || March 27, 2003 || Kitt Peak || Spacewatch || — || align=right | 2.4 km || 
|-id=984 bgcolor=#d6d6d6
| 350984 ||  || — || March 28, 2003 || Catalina || CSS || — || align=right | 2.8 km || 
|-id=985 bgcolor=#d6d6d6
| 350985 ||  || — || March 28, 2003 || Kitt Peak || Spacewatch || — || align=right | 2.8 km || 
|-id=986 bgcolor=#fefefe
| 350986 ||  || — || March 26, 2003 || Palomar || NEAT || — || align=right | 1.0 km || 
|-id=987 bgcolor=#d6d6d6
| 350987 ||  || — || March 27, 2003 || Kitt Peak || Spacewatch || — || align=right | 4.1 km || 
|-id=988 bgcolor=#FFC2E0
| 350988 ||  || — || April 4, 2003 || Haleakala || NEAT || APO +1km || align=right | 1.6 km || 
|-id=989 bgcolor=#d6d6d6
| 350989 ||  || — || April 1, 2003 || Palomar || NEAT || EOS || align=right | 2.6 km || 
|-id=990 bgcolor=#d6d6d6
| 350990 ||  || — || April 7, 2003 || Kitt Peak || Spacewatch || HYG || align=right | 2.9 km || 
|-id=991 bgcolor=#d6d6d6
| 350991 ||  || — || April 7, 2003 || Kitt Peak || Spacewatch || — || align=right | 3.0 km || 
|-id=992 bgcolor=#d6d6d6
| 350992 ||  || — || April 9, 2003 || Kitt Peak || Spacewatch || — || align=right | 3.1 km || 
|-id=993 bgcolor=#d6d6d6
| 350993 ||  || — || April 9, 2003 || Reedy Creek || J. Broughton || — || align=right | 3.5 km || 
|-id=994 bgcolor=#d6d6d6
| 350994 ||  || — || April 8, 2003 || Socorro || LINEAR || — || align=right | 3.0 km || 
|-id=995 bgcolor=#d6d6d6
| 350995 ||  || — || April 8, 2003 || Palomar || NEAT || — || align=right | 2.9 km || 
|-id=996 bgcolor=#d6d6d6
| 350996 ||  || — || April 11, 2003 || Kitt Peak || Spacewatch || — || align=right | 3.7 km || 
|-id=997 bgcolor=#d6d6d6
| 350997 ||  || — || April 22, 2003 || Nashville || R. Clingan || — || align=right | 3.6 km || 
|-id=998 bgcolor=#FA8072
| 350998 ||  || — || April 28, 2003 || Anderson Mesa || LONEOS || H || align=right data-sort-value="0.89" | 890 m || 
|-id=999 bgcolor=#fefefe
| 350999 ||  || — || April 24, 2003 || Anderson Mesa || LONEOS || PHO || align=right | 2.0 km || 
|-id=000 bgcolor=#fefefe
| 351000 ||  || — || April 27, 2003 || Anderson Mesa || LONEOS || — || align=right | 1.0 km || 
|}

References

External links 
 Discovery Circumstances: Numbered Minor Planets (350001)–(355000) (IAU Minor Planet Center)

0350